= List of statutory instruments of the United Kingdom, 1995 =

This is a complete list of all 1,872 statutory instruments published in the United Kingdom in the year 1995.

== 1–100 ==
- National Health Service (Optical Charges and Payments) (Scotland) Amendment Regulations 1995 (S.I. 1995/1)
- Plymouth Hospitals National Health Service Trust (Transfer of Trust Property) Order 1995 (S.I. 1995/2)
- Chester—Bangor Trunk Road (A55) (Aber Improvement) Detrunking Order 1995 (S.I. 1995/5)
- Criminal Justice Act 1988 (Reviews of Sentencing) Order 1995 (S.I. 1995/10)
- Pigs (Records, Identification and Movement) Order 1995 (S.I. 1995/11)
- Bovine Animals (Records, Identification and Movement) Order 1995 (S.I. 1995/12)
- Enzootic Bovine LeUkosis (Amendment) Order 1995 (S.I. 1995/13)
- Beef Special Premium (Amendment) Regulations 1995 (S.I. 1995/14)
- Suckler Cow Premium (Amendment) Regulations 1995 (S.I. 1995/15)
- Fertilisers (Amendment) Regulations 1995 (S.I. 1995/16)
- A23 Trunk Road (Brighton Road, Croydon) (Prohibition of Right Turn and U-Turn) Order 1995 (S.I. 1995/17)
- Community Charges (Administration and Enforcement) (Amendment) Regulations 1995 (S.I. 1995/21)
- Council Tax (Administration and Enforcement) (Amendment) Regulations 1995 (S.I. 1995/22)
- Local Government Changes for England (Council Tax and Non-Domestic Rating, Demand Notices) Regulations 1995 (S.I. 1995/23)
- Criminal Justice and Public Order Act 1994 (Commencement No. 4) Order 1995 (S.I. 1995/24)
- Industrial Training Levy (Construction Board) Order 1995 (S.I. 1995/25)
- Industrial Training Levy (Engineering Construction Board) Order 1995 (S.I. 1995/26)
- Employment Protection (Part-time Employees) Regulations 1995 (S.I. 1995/31)
- Borough of Trafford (Eastern Spine Canal Bridge) Scheme 1993 Confirmation Instrument 1995 (S.I. 1995/33)
- National Health Service (Optical Charges and Payments) Amendment Regulations 1995 (S.I. 1995/34)
- Occupational and Personal Pension Schemes (Miscellaneous Amendments) Regulations 1995 (S.I. 1995/35)
- Borough of Trafford (A5063 Trafford Road/White City Gyratory System Canal Bridges) Scheme 1993 Confirmation Instrument 1995 (S.I. 1995/38)
- Food Protection (Emergency Prohibitions) (Radioactivity in Sheep) (England) (Partial Revocation) Order 1995 (S.I. 1995/39)
- Apple Orchard Grubbing Up (Amendment) Regulations 1995 (S.I. 1995/40)
- Justices of the Peace Act 1949 (Compensation) (Variation) Regulations 1995 (S.I. 1995/41)
- Police and Magistrates' Courts Act 1994 (Commencement No. 6 and Transitional Provisions) Order 1995 (S.I. 1995/42)
- Criminal Justice Act 1993 (Commencement No. 8) Order 1995 (S.I. 1995/43)
- District of Bromsgrove (Electoral Arrangements) Order 1995 (S.I. 1995/44)
- Education (Special Educational Needs) (Prescribed Forms) (Welsh Forms) Regulations 1995 (S.I. 1995/45)
- Food Protection (Emergency Prohibitions) (Radioactivity in Sheep) (Wales) (Partial Revocation) Order 1995 (S.I. 1995/46)
- Food Protection (Emergency Prohibitions) (Radioactivity in Sheep) Partial Revocation Order 1995 (S.I. 1995/48)
- Home Energy Efficiency Grants (Amendment) Regulations 1995 (S.I. 1995/49)
- Education (National Curriculum) (Attainment Targets and Programmes of Study in English) Order 1995 (S.I. 1995/51)
- Education (National Curriculum) (Attainment Targets and Programmes of Study in Mathematics) Order 1995 (S.I. 1995/52)
- Education (National Curriculum) (Attainment Targets and Programmes of Study in Science) Order 1995 (S.I. 1995/53)
- Education (National Curriculum) (Attainment Targets and Programmes of Study in History) (England) Order 1995 (S.I. 1995/54)
- Education (National Curriculum) (Attainment Targets and Programmes of Study in Geography) (England) Order 1995 (S.I. 1995/55)
- Education (National Curriculum) (Attainment Targets and Programmes of Study in Technology) Order 1995 (S.I. 1995/56)
- Education (National Curriculum) (Attainment Targets and Programmes of Study in Modern Foreign Languages) Order 1995 (S.I. 1995/57)
- Education (National Curriculum) (Attainment Targets and Programmes of Study in Art) (England) Order 1995 (S.I. 1995/58)
- Education (National Curriculum) (Attainment Targets and Programmes of Study in Music) (England) Order 1995 (S.I. 1995/59)
- Education (National Curriculum) (Attainment Targets and Programmes of Study in Physical Education) Order 1995 (S.I. 1995/60)
- Education (Schools Conducted by Education Associations) (Amendment) Regulations 1995 (S.I. 1995/61)
- Electricity (Non–Fossil Fuel Sources) (England and Wales) (Amendment) Order 1995 (S.I. 1995/68)
- Education (National Curriculum) (Attainment Targets and Programmes of Study in Welsh) Order 1995 (S.I. 1995/69)
- Education (National Curriculum) (Attainment Targest and Programmes of Study in Music) (Wales) Order 1995 (S.I. 1995/70)
- Education (National Curriculum) (Attainment Targets and Programmes of Study in Art) (Wales) Order 1995 (S.I. 1995/71)
- Education (National Curriculum) (Attainment Targets and Programmes of Study in Geography) (Wales) Order 1995 (S.I. 1995/72)
- Education (National Curriculum) (Attainment Targest and Programmes of Study in History) (Wales) Order 1995 (S.I. 1995/73)
- Social Security (Widow's Benefit and Retirement Pensions) Amendment Regulations 1995 (S.I. 1995/74)
- Infant Formula and Follow–on Formula Regulations 1995 (S.I. 1995/77)
- Hartlepools Water Company (Constitution and Regulation) Order 1995 (S.I. 1995/79)
- National Health Service (General Medical Services) Amendment Regulations 1995 (S.I. 1995/80)
- City Hospitals Sunderland National Health Service Trust (Transfer of Trust Property) Order 1995 (S.I. 1995/82)
- Derbyshire Royal Infirmary National Health Service Trust (Transfer of Trust Property) Order 1995 (S.I. 1995/83)
- North Tyneside Health Care National Health Service Trust (Transfer of Trust Property) Order 1995 (S.I. 1995/84)
- Southport and Formby Community Health Services National Health Service Trust (Transfer of Trust Property) Order 1995 (S.I. 1995/85)
- West Lancashire National Health Service Trust (Transfer of Trust Property) Order 1995 (S.I. 1995/86)
- Wrightington Hospital National Health Service Trust (Transfer of Trust Property) Order 1995 (S.I. 1995/87)
- Princess Royal Hospital National Health Service Trust (Establishment) Amendment Order 1995 (S.I. 1995/88)
- Priority Healthcare Wearside National Health Service Trust (Transfer of Trust Property) Order 1995 (S.I. 1995/89)
- Pilgrim Health National Health Service Trust (Transfer of Trust Property) Order 1995 (S.I. 1995/90)
- Royal Hull Hospital National Health Service Trust (Establishment) Amendment Order 1995 (S.I. 1995/91)
- Cumbria Ambulance Service National Health Service Trust (Establishment) Amendment Order 1995 (S.I. 1995/92)
- Teddington Memorial Hospital National Health Service Trust (Establishment) Amendment Order 1995 (S.I. 1995/99)
- Hill Livestock (Compensatory Allowances) (Amendment) Regulations 1995 (S.I. 1995/100)

== 101–200 ==
- Residuary Body for Wales (Capital Finance) Regulations 1995 (S.I. 1995/101)
- Residuary Body for Wales (Miscellaneous Provisions) Order 1995 (S.I. 1995/102)
- Residuary Body for Wales (Appointed Day) Order 1995 (S.I. 1995/103)
- Local Government Reorganisation (Wales) (Consequential Amendments) Order 1995 (S.I. 1995/115)
- North Hampshire Hospitals National Health Service Trust (Establishment) Amendment Order 1995 (S.I. 1995/117)
- Council Tax and Non-Domestic Rating (Demand Notices) (England) Amendment Regulations 1995 (S.I. 1995/121)
- Gaming (Bingo) Act (Variation of Monetary Limit) Order 1995 (S.I. 1995/122)
- Child Support (Miscellaneous Amendments) Regulations 1995 (S.I. 1995/123)
- A205 Trunk Road (Richmond and Wandsworth) Red Route Experimental Traffic Order 1995 (S.I. 1995/124)
- A205 Trunk Road (Hounslow) Red Route (Bus Lanes) Experimental Traffic Order 1995 (S.I. 1995/125)
- A205 Trunk Road (Hounslow) Red Route Experimental Traffic Order 1995 (S.I. 1995/126)
- Criminal Justice and Public Order Act 1994 (Commencement No. 5 and Transitional Provisions) Order 1995 (S.I. 1995/127)
- Local Government Reorganisation (Wales) (Special Grant) Order 1995 (S.I. 1995/128)
- Welfare of Animals during Transport (Amendment) Order 1995 (S.I. 1995/131)
- Lyon Court and Office Fees (Variation) Order 1995 (S.I. 1995/132)
- Police (Scotland) Amendment Regulations 1995 (S.I. 1995/137)
- Land Registration Rules 1995 (S.I. 1995/140)
- West Wales Ambulance National Health Service Trust (Establishment) Order 1995 (S.I. 1995/141)
- Cardiff Community Healthcare National Health Service Trust (Establishment) Order 1995 (S.I. 1995/142)
- University Dental Hospital National Health Service Trust (Establishment) Order 1995 (S.I. 1995/143)
- Telecommunications Terminal Equipment (Amendment) Regulations 1995 (S.I. 1995/144)
- Law of Property (Miscellaneous Provisions) Act 1994 (Commencement No. 1) Order 1995 (S.I. 1995/145)
- Financial Assistance for Environmental Purposes Order 1995 (S.I. 1995/150)
- Returning Officers (Principal Areas: Wales) Order 1995 (S.I. 1995/151)
- Value Added Tax (General) (Amendment) Regulations 1995 (S.I. 1995/152)
- Merchant Shipping (Hours of Work) Regulations 1995 (S.I. 1995/157)
- Motorways Traffic (England and Wales) (Amendment) Regulations 1995 (S.I. 1995/158)
- Coal Industry Act 1994 (Commencement No. 4) Order 1995 (S.I. 1995/159)
- Council Tax (Demand Notices) (Wales) (Amendment) Regulations 1995 (S.I. 1995/160)
- Local Government Finance (Miscellaneous Provisions) (England) Order 1995 (S.I. 1995/161)
- Legal Aid Advisory Committee (Dissolution) Order 1995 (S.I. 1995/162)
- Valuation Timetable (Scotland) Order 1995 (S.I. 1995/164)
- National Health Service (General Medical and Pharmaceutical Services) (Scotland) Amendment Regulations 1995 (S.I. 1995/165)
- Mackerel (Specified Sea Areas) (Prohibition of Fishing) Order 1995 (S.I. 1995/168)
- Friendly Societies (Taxation of Transfers of Business) Regulations 1995 (S.I. 1995/171)
- Education (Financial Delegation to Schools) (Mandatory Exceptions) Regulations 1995 (S.I. 1995/178)
- Public Telecommunication System Designation (AT&T Communications (UK) LTD) Order 1995 (S.I. 1995/182)
- Education (Welsh Agricultural College Higher Education Corporation) (Dissolution) Order 1995 (S.I. 1995/183)
- Surplus Food Regulations 1995 (S.I. 1995/184)
- Public Service Vehicles (Lost Property) (Amendment) Regulations 1995 (S.I. 1995/185)
- Public Service Vehicles (Conduct of Drivers, Inspectors, Conductors and Passengers) (Amendment) Regulations 1995 (S.I. 1995/186)
- Cleveland (Structural Change) Order 1995 (S.I. 1995/187)
- Housing Revenue Account General Fund Contribution Limits (Scotland) Order 1995 (S.I. 1995/188)
- Environmentally Sensitive Areas (North Peak) Designation (Amendment) Order 1995 (S.I. 1995/189)
- Environmentally Sensitive Areas (Clun) Designation (Amendment) Order 1995 (S.I. 1995/190)
- Environmentally Sensitive Areas (Test Valley) Designation (Amendment) Order 1995 (S.I. 1995/191)
- Environmentally Sensitive Areas (South West Peak) Designation (Amendment) Order 1995 (S.I. 1995/192)
- Environmentally Sensitive Areas (Lake District) Designation (Amendment) Order 1995 (S.I. 1995/193)
- Environmentally Sensitive Areas (Suffolk River Valleys) Designation (Amendment) Order 1995 (S.I. 1995/194)
- Environmentally Sensitive Areas (Exmoor) Designation (Amendment) Order 1995 (S.I. 1995/195)
- Environmentally Sensitive Areas (South Wessex Downs) Designation (Amendment) Order 1995 (S.I. 1995/196)
- Environmentally Sensitive Areas (Avon Valley) Designation (Amendment) Order 1995 (S.I. 1995/197)
- Environmentally Sensitive Areas (Breckland) Designation (Amendment) Order 1995 (S.I. 1995/198)
- Environmentally Sensitive Areas (North Kent Marshes) Designation (Amendment) Order 1995 (S.I. 1995/199)
- Environmentally Sensitive Areas (Cotswold Hills) Designation (Amendment) Order 1995 (S.I. 1995/200)

== 201–300 ==
- Public Supply Contracts Regulations 1995 (S.I. 1995/201)
- Financial Services Act 1986 (Miscellaneous Exemptions) Order 1995 (S.I. 1995/202)
- A11 Trunk Road (Thetford Bypass Slip Roads) (Trunking) Order 1995 (S.I. 1995/203)
- Toys (Safety) Regulations 1995 (S.I. 1995/204)
- High Court and County Courts Jurisdiction (Amendment) Order 1995 (S.I. 1995/205)
- County Court Remedies (Amendment) Regulations 1995 (S.I. 1995/206)
- Veterinary Surgeons and Veterinary Practitioners (Registration) (Amendment) Regulations Order of Council 1995 (S.I. 1995/207)
- Education (School Financial Statements) (Prescribed Particulars etc.) Regulations 1995 (S.I. 1995/208)
- Council Tax (Transitional Reduction Scheme) (England) Regulations 1995 (S.I. 1995/209)
- Mortgage Indemnities (Recognised Bodies) Order 1995 (S.I. 1995/210)
- Housing (Right to Buy) (Priority of Charges) Order1995 (S.I. 1995/211)
- Local Government Changes for England (Non-Domestic Rating, Collection and Enforcement and Discretionary Relief) Regulations 1995 (S.I. 1995/212)
- Valuation for Rating (Former Enterprise Zones) Regulations 1995 (S.I. 1995/213)
- Local Government Superannuation (Scotland) Amendment Regulations 1995 (S.I. 1995/214)
- Police Regulations 1995 (S.I. 1995/215)
- Income Tax (Employments) (Amendment) Regulations 1995 (S.I. 1995/216)
- Income Tax (Sub–contractors in the Construction Industry) (Amendment) Regulations 1995 (S.I. 1995/217)
- Cardiff—Glan Conwy Trunk Road (A470) (Cancoed to Minffordd Improvement) Order 1995 (S.I. 1995/219)
- Chester—Bangor Trunk Road (A55) (Aber Improvement) Detrunking Order 1995 (S.I. 1995/220)
- Leeds City Council (M1—A1 Link Road/East Leeds Radial (A63) Junction Connecting Roads) Scheme 1993 Confirmation Instrument 1995 (S.I. 1995/231)
- Telecommunications (Registers) Order 1995 (S.I. 1995/232)
- Local Authorities (Alteration of Requisite Calculations and Funds) Regulations 1995 (S.I. 1995/234)
- Billing Authorities (Anticipation of Precepts) (Amendment) Regulations 1995 (S.I. 1995/235)
- Fruit Juices and Fruit Nectars (England, Wales and Scotland) (Amendment) Regulations 1995 (S.I. 1995/236)
- Overseas Service (Pensions Supplement) Regulations 1995 (S.I. 1995/238)
- Non-Domestic Rating (Telecommunications and Canals) (Scotland) Order 1995 (S.I. 1995/239)
- Environmentally Sensitive Areas Designation (Wales) (Amendment) Order 1995 (S.I. 1995/242)
- Environmentally Sensitive Areas (Cambrian Mountains) Designation (Amendment) Order 1995 (S.I. 1995/243)
- Wireless Telegraphy (Licence Charges) (Amendment) Regulations 1995 (S.I. 1995/244)
- Police and Magistrates' Courts Act 1994 (Commencement No. 5 and Transitional Provisions) (Amendment) Order 1995 (S.I. 1995/246)
- Local Government Changes for England (Community Charge and Council Tax, Administration and Enforcement) Regulations 1995 (S.I. 1995/247)
- Land Registration (Scotland) Amendment Rules 1995 (S.I. 1995/248)
- Dairy Produce Quotas (Amendment) Regulations 1995 (S.I. 1995/254)
- Coal Industry (Abolition of Domestic Coal Consumers' Council) Order 1995 (S.I. 1995/255)
- Local Land Charges (Amendment) Rules 1995 (S.I. 1995/260)
- Council for the Central Laboratory of the Research Councils Order 1995 (S.I. 1995/261)
- European Communities (Designation) Order 1995 (S.I. 1995/262)
- Health and Safety at Work etc. Act 1974 (Application outside Great Britain) Order 1995 (S.I. 1995/263)
- Child Abduction and Custody (Parties to Conventions) (Amendment) Order 1995 (S.I. 1995/264)
- European Communities (Definition of Treaties) (The Agreement Establishing the World Trade Organisation) Order 1995 (S.I. 1995/265)
- World Trade Organisation (Immunities and Privileges) Order 1995 (S.I. 1995/266)
- Public Health (Ships and Aircraft) (Isle of Man) (Revocation) Order 1995 (S.I. 1995/267)
- Wireless Telegraphy (Isle of Man) Order 1995 (S.I. 1995/268)
- Transfer of Functions (Treasury and Minister for the Civil Service) Order 1995 (S.I. 1995/269)
- Somerset County Council (Bridgwater Northern Distributor Road Bridge) Scheme 1992 Confirmation Instrument 1995 (S.I. 1995/270)
- Dual-Use and Related Goods (Export Control) Regulations 1995 (S.I. 1995/271)
- Coal Industry Act 1994 (Commencement No. 5) Order 1995 (S.I. 1995/273)
- Insolvency of Employer (Excluded Classes) Regulations 1995 (S.I. 1995/278)
- Value Added Tax (Buildings and Land) Order 1995 Approved by the House of Commons S.I. 1995/279)
- Value Added Tax (Construction of Buildings) Order 1995 Approved by the House of Commons S.I. 1995/280)
- Value Added Tax (Input Tax) (Amendment) Order 1995 (S.I. 1995/281)
- Value Added Tax (Land) Order 1995 (S.I. 1995/282)
- Value Added Tax (Projected Buildings) Order 1995 (S.I. 1995/283)
- Non–Domestic Rating (Demand Notices) (Wales) (Amendment) Regulations 1995 (S.I. 1995/284)
- Waste Management Licensing (Amendment etc.) Regulations 1995 (S.I. 1995/288)
- Isle of Wight (Staff Transfer) Order 1995 (S.I. 1995/289)
- Value Added Tax (Payments on Account) (Amendment) Order 1995 Approved by the House of Commons S.I. 1995/291)
- Food Protection (Emergency Prohibitions) (Oil and Chemical Pollution of Fish) (No.2) Order 1993 (Partial Revocation No.4) Order 1995 (S.I. 1995/292)
- A3 Trunk Road (Kingston By-Pass, Kingston upon Thames and Merton) (40 m.p.h. Speed Limit) Order 1995 (S.I. 1995/296)
- Town and Country Planning (Use Classes) (Amendment) Order 1995 (S.I. 1995/297)
- Town and Country Planning General Development (Amendment) Order 1995 (S.I. 1995/298)
- A638 Trunk Road (King Royd Lane, Brackenhill Common, Ackworth to District Boundary, South Elmsall) (Detrunking) Order 1995 (S.I. 1995/299)
- National Health Service Pension Scheme Regulations 1995 (S.I. 1995/300)

== 301–400 ==
- Brent and Harrow Health Authority (Transfer of Trust Property) Order 1995 (S.I. 1995/301)
- Approved Probation and Bail Hostel Rules 1995 (S.I. 1995/302)
- Genetically Modified Organisms (Deliberate Release) Regulations 1995 (S.I. 1995/304)
- Public Service Vehicles (Conditions of Fitness, Equipment, Use and Certification) (Amendment) Regulations 1995 (S.I. 1995/305)
- Scottish Land Court (Fees) Order 1995 (S.I. 1995/307)
- Lands Tribunal for Scotland (Amendment) (Fees) Rules 1995 (S.I. 1995/308)
- Medicines (Advisory Board on the Registration of Homoeopathic Products) Order 1995 (S.I. 1995/309)
- Social Security (Incapacity Benefit) (Transitional) Regulations 1995 (S.I. 1995/310)
- Social Security (Incapacity for Work) (General) Regulations 1995 (S.I. 1995/311)
- Non-Domestic Rate (Scotland) Order 1995 (S.I. 1995/312)
- A3 Trunk Road (Malden Way, Kingston upon Thames) (Prescribed Routes) Order 1995 (S.I. 1995/320)
- Gaming Act (Variation of Fees) Order 1995 (S.I. 1995/321)
- Gaming (Bingo) Act (Fees) (Amendment) Order 1995 (S.I. 1995/322)
- Lotteries (Gaming Board Fees) Order 1995 (S.I. 1995/323)
- Nottingham City Hospital National Health Service Trust (Transfer of Trust Property) Order 1995 (S.I. 1995/324)
- A3 Trunk Road (Wandsworth) Red Route (Clearway) Experimental Traffic Order 1995 (S.I. 1995/335)
- A3 Trunk Road (Merton) Red Route Experimental Traffic Order 1995 (S.I. 1995/336)
- A3 Trunk Road (Kingston upon Thames) Red Route (Clearway) Experimental Traffic Order 1995 (S.I. 1995/337)
- A3 Trunk Road (Merton) Red Route (Clearway) Experimental Traffic Order 1995 (S.I. 1995/338)
- A3 Trunk Road (Kingston upon Thames) Red Route Experimental Traffic Order 1995 (S.I. 1995/339)
- Local Government (Compensation for Redundancy or Premature Retirement on Reorganisation) (Scotland) Regulations 1995 (S.I. 1995/340)
- Carlisle Hospitals National Health Service Trust (Transfer of Trust Property) Order 1995 (S.I. 1995/341)
- Guild Community Healthcare National Health Service Trust (Transfer of Trust Property) Order 1995 (S.I. 1995/342)
- Hounslow and Spelthorne Community and Mental Health National Health Service Trust (Transfer of Trust Property) Order 1995 (S.I. 1995/343)
- Lancashire Ambulance Service National Health Service Trust (Transfer of Trust Property) Order 1995 (S.I. 1995/344)
- Preston Acute Hospitals National Health Service Trust (Transfer of Trust Property) Order 1995 (S.I. 1995/345)
- Richmond, Twickenham and Roehampton Healthcare National Health Service Trust (Transfer of Trust Property) Order 1995 (S.I. 1995/346)
- St. Albans and Hemel Hempstead National Health Service Trust (Transfer of Trust Property) Order 1995 (S.I. 1995/347)
- Trafford Healthcare National Health Service Trust (Transfer of Trust Property) Order 1995 (S.I. 1995/348)
- Lloyd's Underwriters (Tax) Regulations 1995 (S.I. 1995/351)
- Lloyd's Underwriters (Tax) (1992–93 to 1996–97) Regulations 1995 (S.I. 1995/352)
- Lloyd's Underwriters (Special Reserve Funds) Regulations 1995 (S.I. 1995/353)
- Milk Development Council Order 1995 (S.I. 1995/356)
- Plastic Materials and Articles in Contact with Food (Amendment) Regulations 1995 (S.I. 1995/360)
- Meat (Hygiene, Inspection and Examinations for Residues) (Charges) Regulations 1995 (S.I. 1995/361)
- Agricultural Processing and Marketing Grant Regulations 1995 (S.I. 1995/362)
- Valuation and Community Charge Tribunals (Amendment) (England) Regulations 1995 (S.I. 1995/363)
- Law Reform (Miscellaneous Provisions) (Scotland) Act 1990 (Commencement No.13) Order 1995 (S.I. 1995/364)
- National Health Service Superannuation Scheme (Scotland) Regulations 1995 (S.I. 1995/365)
- Mines and Quarries (Rateable Values) (Scotland) Order 1995 (S.I. 1995/366)
- Water Undertakings (Rateable Values) (Scotland) Order 1995 (S.I. 1995/367)
- British Gas plc. (Rateable Values) (Scotland) Order 1995 (S.I. 1995/368)
- Electricity Generation Lands (Rateable Values) (Scotland) Order 1995 (S.I. 1995/369)
- Electricity Transmission Lands (Rateable Values) (Scotland) Order 1995 (S.I. 1995/370)
- Electricity Generators (Rateable Values) (Scotland) Order 1995 (S.I. 1995/371)
- Electricity Generators (Aluminium) (Rateable Values) (Scotland) Order 1995 (S.I. 1995/372)
- Electricity Distribution Lands (Rateable Values) (Scotland) Order 1995 (S.I. 1995/373)
- Formula Valuation (Revocations) (Scotland) Order 1995 (S.I. 1995/374)
- Docks and Harbours (Rateable Values) (Scotland) Amendment Order 1995 (S.I. 1995/375)
- Recreation Grounds (Revocation of Parish Council Byelaws) Order 1995 (S.I. 1995/376)
- Land Registration (Implied Covenants for Title) Rules 1995 (S.I. 1995/377)
- Bolton Hospitals National Health ServiceTrust (Transfer of Trust Property) Order 1995 (S.I. 1995/378)
- Burton Hospitals National Health Service Trust (Transfer of Trust Property) Order 1995 (S.I. 1995/379)
- Central Nottinghamshire Healthcare National Health Service Trust (Transfer of Trust Property) Order 1995 (S.I. 1995/380)
- Community Healthcare Bolton National Health Service Trust (Transfer of Trust Property) Order 1995 (S.I. 1995/381)
- East Surrey Learning Disability and Mental Health Service National Health Service Trust (Transfer of Trust Property) Order 1995 (S.I. 1995/382)
- Greenwich Healthcare National Health Service Trust (Transfer of Trust Property) Order 1995 (S.I. 1995/383)
- King's Mill Centre for Health Care Services National Health Service Trust (Transfer of Trust Property) Order 1995 (S.I. 1995/384)
- Lincoln Hospitals National Health Service Trust (Transfer of Trust Property) Order 1995 (S.I. 1995/385)
- Premier Health National Health Service Trust (Transfer of Trust Property) Order 1995 (S.I. 1995/386)
- Surrey Ambulance Service National Health Service Trust (Transfer of Trust Property) Order 1995 (S.I. 1995/387)
- Leeds Development Corporation (Planning Functions) Order 1995 (S.I. 1995/389)
- Leeds Development Corporation (Transfer of Property, Rights and Liabilities) Order 1995 (S.I. 1995/390)
- Local Government Finance (Scotland) Order 1995 (S.I. 1995/391)
- Revenue Support Grant (Scotland) Order 1995 (S.I. 1995/392)
- National Health Service Trusts (Originating Capital Debt) (Wales) Order 1995 (S.I. 1995/394)

== 401–500 ==
- Local Government Residuary Body (England) Order 1995 (SI 1995/401)
- Local Government Changes For England (Property Transfer and Transitional Payments) Regulations 1995 (S.I. 1995/402)
- A63 Trunk Road (South Cave Interchange Slip Roads) (Trunking) Order 1995 (S.I. 1995/405)
- A63 Trunk Road (Welton Interchange Slip Roads) (Trunking) Order 1995 (S.I. 1995/406)
- National Health Service Trusts (Originating Capital Debt) Order 1995 (S.I. 1995/407)
- Exchange Gains and Losses (Transitional Provisions) (Amendment) Regulations 1995 (S.I. 1995/408)
- National Health Service (Pharmaceutical Services) (Scotland) Regulations 1995 (S.I. 1995/414)
- Fireworks (Safety) (Revocation) Regulations 1995 (S.I. 1995/415)
- National Health Service (General Medical Services) (Scotland) Regulations 1995 (S.I. 1995/416)
- Town and Country Planning (Environmental Assessment and Permitted Development) Regulations 1995 (S.I. 1995/417)
- Town and Country Planning (General Permitted Development) Order 1995 (SI 1995/418)
- Town and Country Planning (General Development Procedure) Order 1995 (S.I. 1995/419)
- Shrewsbury (Kingsland) Bridge (Revision of Tolls and Traffic Classification) Order 1995 (SI 1995/420)
- Bristol City Docks Harbour Revision Order 1995 (S.I. 1995/421)
- Bristol City Docks (No. 2) Harbour Revision Order 1995 (S.I. 1995/422)
- Marriage Act 1994 (Commencement No. 2) Order 1995 (S.I. 1995/424)
- A64 Trunk Road (Bramham Crossroads) Order 1994 (Variation) Order 1995 (S.I. 1995/425)
- M1–A1 Link (Belle Isle To Bramham Crossroads Section And Connecting Roads) Scheme 1994 (Variation) Scheme 1995 (S.I. 1995/426)
- Non-automatic Weighing Machines and Non-automatic Weighing Instruments (Amendment) Regulations 1995 (S.I. 1995/428)
- Railway Pensions (Substitution and Miscellaneous Provisions) Order 1995 (S.I. 1995/430)
- A65 Trunk Road (Chelker Bends Improvement) Order 1995 (S.I. 1995/432)
- A15 (Brigg and Redbourne Bypass) (Trunking) Order 1955 S.I. 1995/433)
- Dual-Use and Related Goods (Export Control) (Suspension) Regulations 1995 (S.I. 1995/441)
- Gaming Licence Duty (Games) Order 1995 (S.I. 1995/442)
- National Assistance (Sums for Personal Requirements) Regulations 1995 (S.I. 1995/443)
- National Health Service (Dental Charges) Amendment Regulations 1995 (S.I. 1995/444)
- Personal Injuries (Civilians) Amendment Scheme 1995 (S.I. 1995/445)
- Income Tax (Employments) (Amendment No. 2) Regulations 1995 (S.I. 1995/447)
- Income Tax (Sub-contractors in the Construction Industry) (Amendment No. 2) Regulations 1995 (S.I. 1995/448)
- Medical Devices (Consultation Requirements) (Fees) Regulations 1995 (S.I. 1995/449)
- Police and Criminal Evidence Act 1984 (Codes of Practice) (No. 3) Order 1995 (S.I. 1995/450)
- Rail Crossing Extinguishment and Diversion Orders, the Public Path Orders and the Definitive Maps and Statements (Amendment) Regulations 1995 (S.I. 1995/451)
- Housing Support Grant (Scotland) Variation Order 1995 (S.I. 1995/469)
- Housing Support Grant (Scotland) Order 1995 (S.I. 1995/470)
- Edinburgh College of Art (Scotland) Order of Council 1995 (S.I. 1995/471)
- Glan Clwyd District General Hospital National Health Service Trust (Transfer of Trust Property) Order 1995 (S.I. 1995/473)
- Gofal Cymuned Clwydian Community Care National Health Service Trust (Transfer of Trust Property) Order 1995 (S.I. 1995/474)
- Wrexham Maelor Hospital National Health Service Trust (Transfer of Trust Property) Order 1995 (S.I. 1995/475)
- Environmental Protection (Waste Recycling Payments) (Amendment) Regulations 1995 (S.I. 1995/476)
- Broadgreen Hospital National Health Service Trust Dissolution Order 1995 (S.I. 1995/477)
- Fosse Health, Leicestershire Community National Health Service Trust Dissolution Order 1995 (S.I. 1995/478)
- Royal Liverpool University Hospital National Health Service Trust Dissolution Order 1995 (S.I. 1995/479)
- St. James's University Hospital National Health Service Trust Dissolution Order 1995 (S.I. 1995/480)
- Weybourne Community National Health Service Trust Dissolution Order 1995 (S.I. 1995/481)
- Disability Working Allowance and Income Support (General) Amendment Regulations 1995 (S.I. 1995/482)
- Certification Officer (Amendment of Fees) Regulations 1995 (S.I. 1995/483)
- Spirit Drinks (Scotland) Amendment Regulations 1995 (S.I. 1995/484)
- A5 Trunk Road (Priorslee—Gailey) (Detrunking) Order 1995 (S.I. 1995/485)
- Antarctic Regulations 1995 (S.I. 1995/490)
- Police and Magistrates' Courts Act 1994 (Commencement No.7 and Transitional Provisions) (Scotland) Order 1995 (S.I. 1995/492)
- Avon (Structural Change) Order 1995 (S.I. 1995/493)
- Offshore Installations (Safety Zones) Order 1995 (S.I. 1995/494)
- Port of Folkestone Licensing (Liquor) Order 1995 (S.I. 1995/495)
- Port of Ramsgate Licensing (Liquor) Order 1995 (S.I. 1995/496)
- Civil Aviation (Navigation Services Charges) Regulations 1995 (S.I. 1995/497)

== 501–600 ==
- Education (Grants for Education Support and Training) (Wales) Regulations 1995 (S.I. 1995/501)
- Carmarthen and District National Health Service Trust (Transfer of Trust Property) Order 1995 (S.I. 1995/502)
- Derwen National Health Service Trust (Transfer of Trust Property) Order 1995 (S.I. 1995/503)
- Ceredigion and Mid Wales National Health Service Trust (Transfer of Trust Property) Order 1995 (S.I. 1995/504)
- Llanelli Dinefwr National Health Service Trust (Transfer of Trust Property) Order 1995 (S.I. 1995/505)
- Misuse of Drugs (Licence Fees) (Amendment) Regulations 1995 (S.I. 1995/506)
- Coal Industry Act 1994 (British Coal Corporation) Extinguishment of Loans Order 1995 (S.I. 1995/509)
- Marriages (Approved Premises) Regulations 1995 (S.I. 1995/510)
- Housing Benefit and Council Tax Benefit (Amendment) Regulations 1995 (S.I. 1995/511)
- Statutory Sick Pay Percentage Threshold Order 1995 (S.I. 1995/512)
- Statutory Sick Pay Percentage Threshold Order 1995 (Consequential) Regulations 1995 (S.I. 1995/513)
- Social Security (Contributions) Amendment Regulations 1995 (S.I. 1995/514)
- Guaranteed Minimum Pensions Increase Order 1995 (S.I. 1995/515)
- Income-related Benefits Schemes (Miscellaneous Amendments) Regulations 1995 (S.I. 1995/516)
- Local Government Act 1988 (Defined Activities) (Exemption of Development Corporations) (Scotland) Order 1995 (S.I. 1995/517)
- Non-Domestic Rating (Unoccupied Property) (Scotland) Amendment Regulations 1995 (S.I. 1995/518)
- Barking Barrage Order 1995 (S.I. 1995/519)
- Local Government Changes for England (Staff) Regulations 1995 (S.I. 1995/520)
- Value Added Tax Act 1994 (Interest on Tax) (Prescribed Rate) Order 1995 (S.I. 1995/521)
- Education (Individual Pupils' Achievements) (Information) (Wales) (Amendment) Regulations 1995 (S.I. 1995/522)
- Occupational and Personal Pension Schemes (Levy) Regulations 1995 (S.I. 1995/524)
- Merchant Shipping (Light Dues) (Amendment) Regulations 1995 (S.I. 1995/525)
- Plant Breeders' Rights (Herbaceous Perennials) Scheme 1995 (S.I. 1995/526)
- Plant Breeders' Rights (Miscellaneous Ornamental Plants) Scheme 1995 (S.I. 1995/527)
- Plant Breeders' Rights (Trees, Shrubs and Woody Climbers) (Variation) Scheme 1995 (S.I. 1995/528)
- Plant Breeders' Rights (Sweet Peas) Scheme 1995 (S.I. 1995/529)
- Plant Breeders' Rights (Vegetables) (including Field Beans and Field Peas) (Variation) Scheme 1995 (S.I. 1995/530)
- Local Government Changes for England (Housing Benefit and Council Tax Benefit) Regulations 1995 (S.I. 1995/531)
- Education (School Financial Statements) (Prescribed Particulars etc.) (Amendment) Regulations 1995 (S.I. 1995/532)
- National Health Service (Determination of Districts) (No. 2) Order 1995 (S.I. 1995/533)
- National Health Service (District Health Authorities) (No. 2) Order 1995 (S.I. 1995/534)
- Local Authorities (Capital Finance) (Rate of Discount for 1995/96) Regulations 1995 (S.I. 1995/535)
- Greater London and Surrey (County and London Borough Boundaries) (Variation) Order 1995 (S.I. 1995/536)
- Bovine Offal (Prohibition) (Scotland) Amendment Regulations 1995 (S.I. 1995/537)
- Central Regional Council (Prohibition of Swimming, Bathing etc. in Reservoirs) Byelaws Extension Order 1995 (S.I. 1995/538)
- Fresh Meat (Hygiene and Inspection) Regulations 1995 (S.I. 1995/539)
- Poultry Meat, Farmed Game Bird Meat and Rabbit Meat (Hygiene and Inspection) Regulations S.I. 1995/540)
- Medicines (Homoeopathic Medicinal Products for Human Use) Amendment Regulations 1995 (S.I. 1995/541)
- Legal Aid in Criminal and Care Proceedings (General) (Amendment) Regulations 1995 (S.I. 1995/542)
- Education (Grants) (Travellers and Displaced Persons) (Amendment) Regulations 1995 (S.I. 1995/543)
- Local Government (Wales) Act 1994 (Commencement No. 3) Order 1995 (S.I. 1995/546)
- Police (Amendment) Regulations 1995 (S.I. 1995/547)
- Non-Domestic Rates (Levying) (Scotland) Regulations 1995 (S.I. 1995/548)
- Non-Domestic Rating (Unoccupied Property) (Amendment) Regulations 1995 (S.I. 1995/549)
- Building Societies (Liquid Asset) (Amendment) Regulations 1995 (S.I. 1995/550)
- Road Vehicles (Construction and Use) (Amendment) Regulations 1995 (S.I. 1995/551)
- British Citizenship (Designated Service) (Amendment) Order 1995 (S.I. 1995/552)
- Local Authorities (Members' Allowances) (Amendment) Regulations 1995 (S.I. 1995/553)
- Financial Assistance for Environmental Purposes (No. 2) Order 1995 (S.I. 1995/554)
- Prosecution of Offences (Custody Time Limits) (Amendment) Regulations 1995 (S.I. 1995/555)
- Local Government (Promotion of Economic Development) (Amendment) Regulations 1995 (S.I. 1995/556)
- National Health Service (General Ophthalmic Services) Amendment Regulations 1995 (S.I. 1995/558)
- Social Security Benefits Up-rating Order 1995 (S.I. 1995/559)
- Housing Benefit and Council Tax Benefit (Miscellaneous Amendments) Regulations 1995 (S.I. 1995/560)
- Social Security (Contributions) (Re–rating and National Insurance Fund Payments) Order 1995 (S.I. 1995/561)
- National Health Service (Determination of Districts) Order 1995 (S.I. 1995/562)
- National Health Service (District Health Authorities) Order 1995 (S.I. 1995/563)
- United Leeds Teaching Hospitals National Health Service Trust (Transfer of Trust Property) Order 1995 (S.I. 1995/564)
- Wolverley National Health Service Trust (Transfer of Trust Property) Order 1995 (S.I. 1995/565)
- Statutory Maternity Pay (Compensation of Employers) Amendment Regulations 1995 (S.I. 1995/566)
- North Wales Ambulance National Health Service Trust (Transfer of Trust Property) Order 1995 (S.I. 1995/567)
- Gwynedd Hospitals National Health Service Trust (Transfer of Trust Property) Order 1995 (S.I. 1995/568)
- Gwynedd Community Health National Health Service Trust (Transfer of Trust Property) Order 1995 (S.I. 1995/569)
- Local Government Reorganisation (Wales) (Transitional Provisions) Order 1995 (S.I. 1995/570)
- Gaming Act (Variation of Fees) (Scotland) Order 1995 (S.I. 1995/571)
- Valuation Appeal Committee (Procedure in Appeals under the Valuation Acts) (Scotland) Regulations 1995 (S.I. 1995/572)
- Valuation Roll and Valuation Notice (Scotland) Amendment Order 1995 (S.I. 1995/573)
- State Hospitals Board for Scotland Order 1995 (S.I. 1995/574)
- Mental Health (State Hospital Management Committee, State Hospital, Carstairs) (Scotland) Transfer and Dissolution Order 1995 (S.I. 1995/575)
- State Hospitals (Scotland) Act 1994 Commencement Order 1995 (S.I. 1995/576)
- National Health Service Trusts (Originating Capital Debt) (Scotland) Order 1995 (S.I. 1995/577)
- Licensed Betting Offices (Amendment) Regulations 1995 (S.I. 1995/578)
- Betting, Gaming and Lotteries Act 1963 (Schedule 4) (Amendment) Order 1995 (S.I. 1995/579)
- Social Security Benefits Up-rating Regulations 1995 (S.I. 1995/580)
- Social Security (Industrial Injuries) (Dependency) (Permitted Earnings Limits) Order 1995 (S.I. 1995/581)
- Magistrates' Courts (Amendment) Rules 1995 (S.I. 1995/585)
- Insolvency (Amendment) Rules 1995 (S.I. 1995/586)
- Education (Grant–maintained Schools) (Finance) (Wales) Regulations 1995 (S.I. 1995/587)
- Companies Act 1985 (Audit Exemption) (Amendment) Regulations 1995 (S.I. 1995/589)
- Local Government Changes for England Regulations 1995 (S.I. 1995/590)
- Police (Scotland) Amendment (No.2) Regulations 1995 (S.I. 1995/596)
- Council Tax (Discounts) (Scotland) Amendment Regulations 1995 (S.I. 1995/597)
- Council Tax (Exempt Dwellings) (Scotland) Amendment Order 1995 (S.I. 1995/598)
- Council Tax (Discounts) (Scotland) Amendment Order 1995 (S.I. 1995/599)
- Humberside (Structural Change) Order 1995 (S.I. 1995/600)

== 601–700 ==
- Teacher Training Agency (Additional Functions) Order 1995 (S.I. 1995/601)
- Education (Teachers) (Amendment) Regulations 1995 (S.I. 1995/602)
- Education (Bursaries for Teacher Training) (Amendment) Regulations 1995 (S.I. 1995/603)
- Education (University Commissioners) Order 1995 (S.I. 1995/604)
- Education (Grants for Education Support and Training) (England) Regulations 1995 (S.I. 1995/605)
- Plant Breeders' Rights (Fees) (Amendment) Regulations 1995 (S.I. 1995/606)
- Seeds (National Lists of Varieties) (Fees) (Amendment) Regulations 1995 (S.I. 1995/607)
- Norfolk and Suffolk Broads (Extension of Byelaws) Order 1995 (S.I. 1995/608)
- Non–Domestic Rating (Alteration of Lists and Appeals) (Amendment) Regulations 1995 (S.I. 1995/609)
- North Yorkshire (District of York) (Structural and Boundary Changes) Order 1995 (S.I. 1995/610)
- Capital Allowances (Corresponding Northern Ireland Grants) Order 1995 (S.I. 1995/611)
- Sugar Beet (Research and Education) Order 1995 (S.I. 1995/612)
- Bovine Offal (Prohibition) (Amendment) Regulations 1995 (S.I. 1995/613)
- Animal By-Products (Identification) Regulations 1995 (S.I. 1995/614)
- Common Agricultural Policy (Wine) Regulations 1995 (S.I. 1995/615)
- Road Traffic (Special Parking Area) (London Borough of Redbridge) (Amendment) Order 1995 (S.I. 1995/616)
- Road Traffic (Special Parking Area) (Royal Borough of Kingston upon Thames) (Amendment) Order 1995 (S.I. 1995/617)
- Road Traffic (Special Parking Area) (London Borough of Sutton) (Amendment) Order 1995 (S.I. 1995/618)
- Council Tax (Discount Disregards and Exempt Dwellings) (Amendment) Order 1995 (S.I. 1995/619)
- Council Tax (Liability for Owners and Additional Provisions for Discount Disregards) (Amendment) Regulations 1995 (S.I. 1995/620)
- Family Health Services Appeal Authority (Establishment and Constitution) Order 1995 (S.I. 1995/621)
- Family Health Services Appeal Authority Regulations 1995 (S.I. 1995/622)
- Local Government Changes for England (Non-Domestic Rating, Alteration of Lists and Appeals) Regulations 1995 (S.I. 1995/623)
- Local Government Changes for England (Community Charge and Council Tax, Valuation and Community Charge Tribunals and Alteration of Lists and Appeals) Regulations 1995 (S.I. 1995/624)
- Housing Benefit, Council Tax Benefit and Income Support (Amendments) Regulations 1995 (S.I. 1995/625)
- Housing Benefit and Council Tax Benefit (Miscellaneous Amendments) (No. 2) Regulation 1995 (S.I. 1995/626)
- Education (London Residuary Body) (Property Transfer) (Modification and Amendment) Order 1995 (S.I. 1995/627)
- Education (Ballot Expenditure) Regulations 1995 (S.I. 1995/628)
- Education (Payment for Special Educational Needs Supplies) (Amendment) Regulations 1995 (S.I. 1995/629)
- Research Councils (Transfer of Property etc.) Order 1995 (S.I. 1995/630)
- Judicial Pensions and Retirement Act 1993 (Commencement) Order 1995 (S.I. 1995/631)
- Judicial Pensions (Miscellaneous) Regulations 1995 (S.I. 1995/632)
- Judicial Pensions (Qualifying Judicial Offices etc.) (City of London) Order 1995 (S.I. 1995/633)
- Judicial Pensions (Preservation of Benefits) Order 1995 (S.I. 1995/634)
- Judicial Pensions (Appeals) Regulations 1995 (S.I. 1995/635)
- Judicial Pensions (Transfer Between Judicial Pension Schemes) Regulations 1995 (S.I. 1995/636)
- Judicial Pensions (Transfer of Accrued Benefits) Regulations 1995 (S.I. 1995/637)
- Judicial Pensions (Contributions) Regulations 1995 (S.I. 1995/638)
- Judicial Pensions (Additional Voluntary Contributions) Regulations 1995 (S.I. 1995/639)
- Judicial Pensions (Additional Benefits for Disregarded Earnings) Regulations 1995 (S.I. 1995/640)
- Courts and Legal Services Act 1990 (Commencement No. 10) Order 1995 (S.I. 1995/641)
- National Health Service (Travelling Expenses and Remission of Charges) Amendment Regulations 1995 (S.I. 1995/642)
- National Health Service (Charges for Drugs and Appliances) Amendment Regulations 1995 (S.I. 1995/643)
- National Health Service (Pharmaceutical Services) Amendment Regulations 1995 (S.I. 1995/644)
- Charities (Exemption from Accounting Requirements) (Scotland) Amendment Regulations 1995 (S.I. 1995/645)
- Registration of Births, Deaths, Marriages and Divorces (Fees) (Scotland) Amendment Regulations 1995 (S.I. 1995/646)
- Police (Discipline) (Miscellaneous Amendments) (Scotland) Regulations 1995 (S.I. 1995/647)
- Defence Evaluation and Research Agency Trading Fund Order 1995 (S.I. 1995/650)
- Local Authorities (Discretionary Expenditure Limits) (England) Order 1995 (S.I. 1995/651)
- Value Added Tax (Supply of Pharmaceutical Goods) Order 1995 (S.I. 1995/652)
- Value Added Tax (Transport) Order 1995 (S.I. 1995/653)
- Natural History Museum (Authorised Repositories) Order 1995 (S.I. 1995/654)
- Wireless Telegraphy (Television Licence Fees) (Amendment) Regulations 1995 (S.I. 1995/655)
- Northern Ireland (Loans) (Increase of Limit) Order 1995 (S.I. 1995/675)
- Local Government, Planning and Land Act 1980 (Competition) (Scotland) Regulations 1995 (S.I. 1995/677)
- Local Government (Exemption from Competition) (Scotland) Order 1995 (S.I. 1995/678)
- Road Traffic (Special Parking Areas) (London Borough of Lambeth) (Amendment) Order 1995 (S.I. 1995/679)
- Road Traffic (Special Parking Area) (London Borough of Merton) (Amendment) Order 1995 (S.I. 1995/680)
- Police and Magistrates' Courts Act 1994 (Commencement No. 8 and Transitional Provisions) Order 1995 (S.I. 1995/685)
- Justices' Chief Executives and Justices' Clerks (Appointment) Regulations 1995 (S.I. 1995/686)
- Electricity (Standards of Performance) (Amendment) Regulations 1995 (S.I. 1995/687)
- Insurance (Fees) Regulations 1995 (S.I. 1995/688)
- Public Service Vehicles (Operators' Licences) (Amendment) Regulation 1995 (S.I. 1995/689)
- National Health Service (Optical Charges and Payments) Amendment (No. 2) Regulations 1995 (S.I. 1995/691)
- National Health Service (Functions of Family Health Services Authorities) (Prescribing Incentive Schemes) Regulations 1995 (S.I. 1995/692)
- National Health Service (Fund-holding Practices) Amendment Regulations 1995 (S.I. 1995/693)
- Time Off for Public Duties Order 1995 (S.I. 1995/694)
- National Health Service (Expenses of Audit) (Scotland) Regulations 1995 (S.I. 1995/698)
- National Health Service (Charges for Drugs and Appliances) (Scotland) Amendment Regulations 1995 (S.I. 1995/699)
- National Health Service (Travelling Expenses and Remission of Charges) (Scotland) Amendment Regulations 1995 (S.I. 1995/700)

== 701–800 ==
- Local Authorities Etc. (Allowances) (Scotland) Amendment Regulations 1995 (S.I. 1995/701)
- Local Government etc. (Scotland) Act 1994 (Commencement No.3) Order 1995 (S.I. 1995/702)
- National Health Service (Dental Charges) (Scotland) Amendment Regulations 1995 (S.I. 1995/703)
- National Health Service (General Ophthalmic Services) (Scotland) Amendment Regulations 1995 (S.I. 1995/704)
- National Health Service (Optical Charges and Payments) (Scotland) Amendment (No.2) Regulations 1995 (S.I. 1995/705)
- Police (Common Police Services) (Scotland) Revocation Order 1995 (S.I. 1995/706)
- Common Police Services (Scotland) Order 1995 (S.I. 1995/707)
- Pensions Increase (Review) Order 1995 (S.I. 1995/708)
- Friendly Societies (General Charge and Fees) Regulations 1995 (S.I. 1995/709)
- Friendly Societies Act 1992 (Transitional and Consequential Provisions) Regulations 1995 (S.I. 1995/710)
- Building Societies (General Charge and Fees) Regulations 1995 (S.I. 1995/711)
- Industrial and Provident Societies (Credit Unions) (Amendment of Fees) Regulations 1995 (S.I. 1995/712)
- Industrial and Provident Societies (Amendment of Fees) Regulations 1995 (S.I. 1995/713)
- Social Security (Contributions) Amendment (No. 2) Regulations 1995 (S.I. 1995/714)
- Criminal Justice and Public Order Act 1994 (Commencement No. 6) Order 1995 (S.I. 1995/721)
- Police (Disposal of Sound Equipment) Regulations 1995 (S.I. 1995/722)
- Police (Retention and Disposal of Vehicles) Regulations 1995 (S.I. 1995/723)
- Social Security (Contributions) Amendment (No. 3) Regulations 1995 (S.I. 1995/730)
- Welfare of Animals (Slaughter or Killing) Regulations 1995 (S.I. 1995/731)
- Spirit Drinks (Amendment) Regulations 1995 (S.I. 1995/732)
- Rheoliadau (Diwygio) (Ffurflenni a Dogfenni Cymraeg) Cwmnïau 1995 (S.I. 1995/734)
- Companies (Welsh Language Forms and Document) (Amendment) Regulations 1995 (S.I. 1995/734)
- Measuring Equipment (Capacity Measures and Testing Equipment) Regulations 1995 (S.I. 1995/735)
- Companies (Forms) (Amendment) Regulations 1995 (S.I. 1995/736)
- Road Vehicles (Construction and Use) (Amendment) (No. 2) Regulations 1995 (S.I. 1995/737)
- Offshore Installations and Pipeline Works (Management and Administration) Regulations 1995 (S.I. 1995/738)
- European Parliamentary (United Kingdom Representatives) Pensions (Additional Voluntary Contributions Scheme) (No. 2) Order 1995 (S.I. 1995/739)
- Stornoway Harbour Revision Order 1995 (S.I. 1995/740)
- Law Hospital National Health Service Trust (Establishment) Amendment Order 1995 (S.I. 1995/741)
- Royal Infirmary of Edinburgh National Health Service Trust (Establishment) Amendment Order 1995 (S.I. 1995/742)
- Offshore Installations (Prevention of Fire and Explosion, and Emergency Response) Regulations 1995 (S.I. 1995/743)
- Registration of Births, Deaths and Marriages (Miscellaneous Amendments) Regulations 1995 (S.I. 1995/744)
- Cardiff-Glan Conwy Trunk Road (A470) (Felinfach By-Pass) Order 1995 (S.I. 1995/745)
- Workmen's Compensation (Supplementation) (Amendment) Scheme 1995 (S.I. 1995/746)
- Combined Probation Areas (Essex) Order 1995 (S.I. 1995/747)
- County Council of Humberside (River Hull Bridge) Scheme 1994 Confirmation Instrument 1995 (S.I. 1995/748)
- Registered Establishments (Fees) (Scotland) Order 1995 (S.I. 1995/749)
- Local Government (Superannuation and Compensation for Premature Retirement) (Scotland) Amendment Regulations 1995 (S.I. 1995/750)
- European Communities (Designation) (No. 2) Order 1995 (S.I. 1995/751)
- Intelligence Services Act 1994 (Dependent Territories) Order 1995 (S.I. 1995/752)
- Health Service Commissioner (Family Health Services Appeal Authority) Order 1995 (S.I. 1995/753)
- Appropriation (Northern Ireland) Order 1995 (S.I. 1995/754)
- Children (Northern Ireland) Order 1995 (S.I. 1995/755)
- Children (Northern Ireland Consequential Amendments) Order 1995 (S.I. 1995/756)
- Children's Evidence (Northern Ireland) Order 1995 (S.I. 1995/757)
- Fair Employment (Amendment) (Northern Ireland) Order 1995 (S.I. 1995/758)
- Local Government (Miscellaneous Provisions) (Northern Ireland) Order 1995 (S.I. 1995/759)
- Prevention of Terrorism (Temporary Provisions) Act 1989 (Enforcement of External Orders) Order 1995 (S.I. 1995/760)
- Wildlife (Amendment) (Northern Ireland) Order 1995 (S.I. 1995/761)
- Double Taxation Relief (Taxes on Income) (Azerbaijan) Order 1995 (S.I. 1995/762)
- Double Taxation Relief (Taxes on Income) (Malta) Order 1995 (S.I. 1995/763)
- Double Taxation Relief (Taxes on Income) (Republic of Ireland) Order 1995 (S.I. 1995/764)
- Double Taxation Relief (Taxes on Income) (Spain) Order 1995 (S.I. 1995/765)
- Naval, Military and Air Forces etc. (Disablement and Death) Service Pensions Amendment Order 1995 (S.I. 1995/766)
- Social Security (Reciprocal Agreements) Order 1995 (S.I. 1995/767)
- Trustee Investments (Additional Powers) Order 1995 (S.I. 1995/768)
- Glan–y–Mor National Health Service Trust (Establishment) Order 1995 (S.I. 1995/769)
- University Hospital of Wales Healthcare National Health Service Trust (Establishment) Order 1995 (S.I. 1995/770)
- Local Government (Application of Enactments) (Scotland) Order 1995 (S.I. 1995/789)
- National Health Service Trusts (Originating Capital Debt) Amendment Order 1995 (S.I. 1995/791)
- Homewood National Health Service Trust Dissolution Order 1995 (S.I. 1995/792)
- Legal Advice and Assistance (Amendment) Regulations 1995 (S.I. 1995/795)
- Legal Aid in Criminal and Care Proceedings (General) (Amendment) (No. 2) Regulations 1995 (S.I. 1995/796)
- Civil Legal Aid (Assessment of Resources) (Amendment) Regulations 1995 (S.I. 1995/797)
- Local Government Changes for England (Capital Finance) Regulations 1995 (S.I. 1995/798)
- Medicines (Medicated Animal Feeding Stuffs) (Amendment) Regulations 1995 (S.I. 1995/799)

== 801–900 ==
- United Leeds Teaching Hospitals National Health Service Trust Dissolution Order 1995 (S.I. 1995/801)
- Licensed Betting Offices (Scotland) Amendment Regulations 1995 (S.I. 1995/802)
- Prevention of Terrorism (Temporary Provisions) Act 1989 (Continuance) Order 1995 (S.I. 1995/816)
- Local Government (Compensation for Redundancy and Premature Retirement) (Amendment) Regulations 1995 (S.I. 1995/817)
- Registration of Births and Deaths (Welsh Language) (Amendment) Regulations 1995 (S.I. 1995/818)
- A638 Trunk Road (Doncaster Road Railway Bridge, Agbrigg, To Junction With B6273 Garmil Lane, West Of Wragby) (Detrunking) Order 1995 (S.I. 1995/819)
- Local Government Act 1988 (Defined Activities) (Exemption) (Sports and Leisure Management, Catering and Maintenance of Ground) Order 1995 (S.I. 1995/828)
- Social Security (Incapacity Benefit) (Consequential and Transitional Amendments and Savings) Regulations 1995 (S.I. 1995/829)
- Elections (Welsh Forms) Order 1995 (S.I. 1995/830)
- London Cab Order 1995 (S.I. 1995/837)
- Housing Renovation etc. Grants (Reduction of Grant) (Amendment) Regulations 1995 (S.I. 1995/838)
- Housing Renovation etc. Grants (Prescribed Forms and Particulars) (Amendment) Regulations 1995 (S.I. 1995/839)
- Local Government (Education Administration) (Compensation for Redundancy or Premature Retirement on Reorganisation) (Scotland) Regulations 1995 (S.I. 1995/840)
- Local Government and Housing Act 1989 (Commencement No. 17) Order 1995 (S.I. 1995/841)
- Newham Community Health Services National Health Service Trust (Establishment) Order 1995 (S.I. 1995/842)
- City and Hackney Community Services National Health Service Trust (Establishment) Order 1995 (S.I. 1995/843)
- University Hospital Birmingham National Health Service Trust (Establishment) Order 1995 (S.I. 1995/844)
- Royal Orthopaedic Hospital National Health Service Trust (Establishment) Order 1995 (S.I. 1995/845)
- Wolverley National Health Service Trust Dissolution Order 1995 (S.I. 1995/846)
- Tower Hamlets Healthcare National Health Service Trust (Establishment) Order 1995 (S.I. 1995/847)
- Surrey Heartlands National Health Service Trust (Establishment) Order 1995 (S.I. 1995/848)
- Local Authorities (Companies) Order 1995 (S.I. 1995/849)
- Local Authorities (Capital Finance and Approved Investments) (Amendment) Regulations 1995 (S.I. 1995/850)
- Local Government (Wales) Act 1994 (Commencement No. 3) (Amendment) Order 1995 (S.I. 1995/851)
- Local Government (Wales) Act 1994 (Commencement No. 4) Order 1995 (S.I. 1995/852)
- Income Tax (Employments) (Incapacity Benefit) Regulations 1995 (S.I. 1995/853)
- Housing (Change of Landlord) (Payment of Disposal Cost by Instalments) (Amendment) Regulations 1995 (S.I. 1995/854)
- Miners' Welfare Act 1952 (Transfer of Functions of Coal Industry Social Welfare Organisation) Order 1995 (S.I. 1995/855)
- Housing Renovation etc. Grants (Prescribed Forms and Particulars) (Welsh Forms and Particulars) (Amendment) Regulations 1995 (S.I. 1995/857)
- National Assistance (Assessment of Resources) (Amendment) Regulations 1995 (S.I. 1995/858)
- Welsh Highland Railway (Transfer) Light Railway Order 1995 (S.I. 1995/861)
- National Health Service (Injury Benefits) Regulations 1995 (S.I. 1995/866)
- A312 Trunk Road (The Parkway, Hounslow) (50 mph Speed Limit) Order 1995 (S.I. 1995/870)
- Medicines (Fixing of Fees Relating to Medicinal Products for Human Use) Amendment Order 1995 (S.I. 1995/871)
- Housing Benefit and Council tax Benefit (Subsidy) Order 1995 (S.I. 1995/872)
- Housing Benefit and Council Tax Benefit (Subsidy) Amendment Regulations 1995 (S.I. 1995/874)
- Fish Health (Amendment) Regulations 1995 (S.I. 1995/886)
- Plant Protection Products Regulations 1995 (S.I. 1995/887)
- Plant Protection Products (Fees) Regulations 1995 (S.I. 1995/888)
- Road Traffic Accident (Payments for Treatment) Order 1995 (S.I. 1995/889)
- Farm and Conservation Grant (Variation) Scheme 1995 (S.I. 1995/890)
- Heather Moorland (Livestock Extensification) (Scotland) Regulations 1995 (S.I. 1995/891)
- Police and Magistrates' Courts Act 1994 (Commencement No. 5 and Transitional Provisions) (Amendment No. 2) Order 1995 (S.I. 1995/899)
- Local Government Superannuation (Limitation on Earnings and Reckonable Service) Regulations 1995 (S.I. 1995/900)

== 901–1000 ==
- Local Government Superannuation (Equality and Maternity Absence) Regulations 1995 (S.I. 1995/901)
- Education (School Curriculum and Assessment Authority) (Transfer of Functions) Order 1995 (S.I. 1995/903)
- Moorland (Livestock Extensification) Regulations 1995 (S.I. 1995/904)
- Third Country Fishing (Enforcement) Order 1995 (S.I. 1995/907)
- Sea Fishing (Enforcement of Community Quota Measures) Order 1995 (S.I. 1995/908)
- Electricity (Class Exemptions from the Requirement for a Licence) (No. 2) Order 1995 (S.I. 1995/909)
- Prisons (Scotland) Act 1989 (Release of Prisoners etc.) Order 1995 (S.I. 1995/910)
- Prisoners and Criminal Proceedings (Scotland) Act 1993 (Release of Prisoners etc.) Order 1995 (S.I. 1995/911)
- Local Authorities Etc. (Allowances) (Scotland) Regulations 1995 (S.I. 1995/912)
- Value Added Tax (General) (Amendment) (No. 2) Regulations 1995 (S.I. 1995/913)
- Leeds Development Corporation (Area and Constitution) Order 1995 (S.I. 1995/916)
- Profit–Related Pay (Shortfall Recovery) Regulations 1995 (S.I. 1995/917)
- Llandough Hospital National Health Service Trust (Change of Name) Order 1995 (S.I. 1995/918)
- Education (Individual Pupils' Achievements) (Information) (Amendment) Regulations 1995 (S.I. 1995/924)
- Motor Vehicles (Type Approval and Approval Marks) (Fees) Regulations 1995 (S.I. 1995/925)
- Gaming Act (Variation of Monetary Limits) Order 1995 (S.I. 1995/926)
- Gaming Clubs (Hours and Charges) (Amendment) Regulations 1995 (S.I. 1995/927)
- Amusements with Prizes (Variation of Monetary Limits) Order 1995 (S.I. 1995/928)
- Railtrack PLC (Rateable Values) (Scotland) Order 1995 (S.I. 1995/929)
- British Railways Board (Rateable Values) (Scotland) Order 1995 (S.I. 1995/930)
- Portsmouth Hospitals National Health Service Trust (Transfer of Trust Property) Order 1995 (S.I. 1995/932)
- Portsmouth Health Care National Health Service Trust (Transfer of Trust Property) Order 1995 (S.I. 1995/933)
- Hereford Hospitals National Health Service Trust (Transfer of Trust Property) Order 1995 (S.I. 1995/934)
- Dartford and Gravesham National Health Service Trust (Transfer of Trust Property) Order 1995 (S.I. 1995/935)
- Education (Grant-maintained and Grant-maintained Special Schools) (Finance) Regulations 1995 (S.I. 1995/936)
- Winchester and Eastleigh Healthcare National Health Service Trust (Transfer of Trust Property) Order 1995 (S.I. 1995/937)
- Stoke Mandeville Hospital National Health Service Trust (Transfer of Trust Property) Order 1995 (S.I. 1995/938)
- Ministry of Defence Police (Police Committee) Regulations 1995 (S.I. 1995/939)
- Public Telecommunication System Designation (Liberty Communications Limited) Order 1995 (S.I. 1995/941)
- Legal Aid in Contempt Proceedings (Remuneration) Regulations 1995 (S.I. 1995/948)
- Legal Advice and Assistance (Amendment) (No. 2) Regulations 1995 (S.I. 1995/949)
- Legal Advice and Assistance at Police Stations (Remuneration) (Amendment) Regulations 1995 (S.I. 1995/950)
- Legal Advice and Assistance (Duty Solicitor) (Remuneration) (Amendment) Regulations 1995 (S.I. 1995/951)
- Legal Aid in Criminal and Care Proceedings (Costs) (Amendment) Regulations 1995 (S.I. 1995/952)
- Value Added Tax (Special Provisions) (Amendment) Order 1995 (S.I. 1995/957)
- Value Added Tax (Treatment of Transactions) Order 1995 (S.I. 1995/958)
- Environmentally Sensitive Areas (Exmoor) Designation (Amendment) (No. 2) Order 1995 (S.I. 1995/960)
- Non–Domestic Rating (Chargeable Amounts) (Amendment) Regulations 1995 (S.I. 1995/961)
- Electricity Supply Industry (Rateable Values) (Amendment) Order 1995 (S.I. 1995/962)
- Local Government Superannuation (Miscellaneous Provisions) Regulations 1995 (S.I. 1995/963)
- Stornoway (Ferry Terminal) Harbour Revision Order 1995 (S.I. 1995/964)
- Merchant Shipping Act 1970 (Commencement No. 11) Order 1995 (S.I. 1995/965)
- Leeds Development Corporation (Dissolution) Order 1995 (S.I. 1995/966)
- Nurses, Midwives and Health Visitors (Periodic Registration) Amendment Rules Approval Order 1995 (S.I. 1995/967)
- East Surrey Hospital and Community Healthcare National Health Service Trust (Change of Name) Order 1995 (S.I. 1995/968)
- County Court (Amendment) Rules 1995 (S.I. 1995/969)
- County Court (Forms) (Amendment) Rules 1995 (S.I. 1995/970)
- Justices of the Peace (Size and Chairmanship of Bench) Rules 1995 (S.I. 1995/971)
- Merchant Shipping (Employment of Young Persons) Regulations 1995 (S.I. 1995/972)
- Injuries in War (Shore Employments) Compensation (Amendment) Scheme 1995 (S.I. 1995/979)
- Prison (Amendment) Rules 1995 (S.I. 1995/983)
- Young Offender Institution (Amendment) Rules 1995 (S.I. 1995/984)
- Social Security (Incapacity for Work) Miscellaneous Amendments Regulations 1995 (S.I. 1995/987)
- Street Works (Registers, Notices, Directions and Designations) (Amendment) Regulations 1995 (S.I. 1995/990)
- Public Record Office (Fees) Regulations 1995 (S.I. 1995/991)
- Strathclyde Regional Council Prevention of Water Pollution (Mill Glen, Busbie Muir, Munnoch, Caaf, Knockendon, Crosbie, Glenburn, Pundeavon, Cuffhill, Kirkleegreen) Byelaws Extension Order 1995 (S.I. 1995/992)
- Hyde Park and The Regent's Park (Vehicle Parking) Regulations 1995 (S.I. 1995/993)
- Strathclyde Regional Council Prevention of Water Pollution (Skelmorlie Lower, Skelmorlie Upper, Skelmorlie Intakes, Outerwards, Greeto Intake, Haylie, Millport Lower, Millport Upper) Byelaws Extension Order 1995 (S.I. 1995/994)
- Robert Jones and Agnes Hunt Orthopaedic and District Hospital National Health Service Trust (Establishment) Amendment Order 1995 (S.I. 1995/996)
- Local Government Act 1988 (Defined Activities) (Exemption) (Breckland District Council) Order 1995 (S.I. 1995/997)

== 1001–1100 ==
- Premium Savings Bonds (Amendment)Regulations 1995 (S.I. 1995/1002)
- Social Security (Contributions) Amendment (No. 4) Regulations 1995 (S.I. 1995/1003)
- Civil Aviation (Route Charges for Navigation Services) (Amendment) Regulations 1995 (S.I. 1995/1004)
- Building Societies (Commercial Assets) Order 1995 (S.I. 1995/1006)
- Income and Corporation Taxes Act 1988, section 737A, (Appointed Day) Order 1995 (S.I. 1995/1007)
- A5 Trunk Road (Junction 18 (M1) to A5/A5 Link Road Junction) Order 1995 (S.I. 1995/1009)
- Weights and Measures (Guernsey and Alderney) Order 1995 (S.I. 1995/1011)
- N-nitrosamines and N-nitrosatable Substances in Elastomer or Rubber Teats and Dummies (Safety) Regulations 1995 (S.I. 1995/1012)
- Contracting Out (Functions in relation to the Registration of Companies) Order 1995 (S.I. 1995/1013)
- Measuring Equipment (Liquid Fuel and Lubricants) Regulations 1995 (S.I. 1995/1014)
- Education (School Teachers' Pay and Conditions) Order 1995 (S.I. 1995/1015)
- Local Government Pension Scheme Regulations 1995 (S.I. 1995/1019)
- Gaming Act (Variation of Monetary Limits) (Scotland) Order 1995 (S.I. 1995/1020)
- Amusements with Prizes (Variation of Monetary Limits) (Scotland) Order 1995 (S.I. 1995/1021)
- Gaming Clubs (Hours and Charges) (Scotland) Amendment Regulations 1995 (S.I. 1995/1022)
- Act of Sederunt (Rules of the Court of Session 1994 Amendment) (Shorthand Writers' Fees) 1995 (S.I. 1995/1023)
- Act of Sederunt (Fees of Shorthand Writers in the Sheriff Court) (Amendment) 1995 (S.I. 1995/1024)
- Antarctic Act 1994 (Overseas Territories) Order 1995 (SI 1995/1030)
- Child Abduction and Custody (Parties to Conventions) (Amendment) (No. 2) Order 1995 (SI 1995/1031)
- United Nations Arms Embargoes (Dependent Territories) Order 1995 (SI 1995/1032)
- Antarctic Act 1994 (Guernsey) Order 1995 (SI 1995/1033)
- Antarctic Act 1994 (Jersey) Order 1995 (SI 1995/1034)
- Antarctic Act 1994 (Isle of Man) Order 1995 (SI 1995/1035)
- Parliamentary Constituencies (Wales) Order 1995 (SI 1995/1036)
- Parliamentary Constituencies (Scotland) Order 1995 (SI 1995/1037)
- Air Navigation Order 1995 (S.I. 1995/1038)
- Local Government Reorganisation (Wales) (Limitation of Compensation) Regulations 1995 (S.I. 1995/1039)
- Local Government (Wales) (Service Agency Agreements) Regulations 1995 (S.I. 1995/1040)
- Local Government Reorganisation (Wales) (Capital Finance) Order 1995 (S.I. 1995/1041)
- Local Government Reorganisation (Wales) (Transitional Provisions No. 2) Order 1995 (S.I. 1995/1042)
- Local Authorities (Closure of Accounts) (Wales) Order 1995 (S.I. 1995/1043)
- Civil Legal Aid (Scotland) (Fees) Amendment Regulations 1995 (S.I. 1995/1044)
- Child Support and Income Support (Amendment) Regulations 1995 (S.I. 1995/1045)
- Excise Goods (Drawback) Regulations 1995 (S.I. 1995/1046)
- Charities (The Bridge House Estates) Order 1995 (SI 1995/1047)
- A61 Trunk Road (Tankersley Roundabout, Birdwell to Old County Borough Boundary, Barnsley) (Detrunking) Order 1995 (S.I. 1995/1048)
- Personal and Occupational Pension Schemes (Pensions Ombudsman) (Procedure) Rules 1995 (S.I. 1995/1053)
- Civil Aviation (Air Travel Organisers' Licensing) Regulations 1995 (S.I. 1995/1054)
- Local Government Changes For England (No. 2) Regulations 1995 (S.I. 1995/1055)
- Police Cadets (Scotland) Amendment Regulations 1995 (S.I. 1995/1057)
- Portsmouth (Camber Dock) Harbour Revision Order 1995 (S.I. 1995/1063)
- Civil Legal Aid (Scotland) Amendment Regulations 1995 (S.I. 1995/1065)
- Advice and Assistance (Scotland) Amendment Regulations 1995 (S.I. 1995/1066)
- Free Zone (Humberside) Designation (Variation) Order 1995 (S.I. 1995/1067)
- Value Added Tax (General) (Amendment) (No. 3) Regulations 1995 (S.I. 1995/1069)
- Social Security Revaluation of Earnings Factors Order 1995 (S.I. 1995/1070)
- London Regional Transport (Penalty Fares) Act 1992 (Activating No. 2) Order 1995 (S.I. 1995/1071)
- Wireless Telegraphy (Short Range Devices) (Exemption) (Amendment) Regulations 1995 (S.I. 1995/1081)
- Financial Assistance for Environmental Purposes (No. 3) Order 1995 (S.I. 1995/1085)
- Dairy Products (Hygiene) Regulations 1995 (S.I. 1995/1086)
- South and East Wales Ambulance National Health Service Trust (Transfer of Trust Property) Order 1995 (S.I. 1995/1088)
- Morriston Hospital National Health Service Trust (Transfer of Trust Property) Order 1995 (S.I. 1995/1089)
- Nevill Hall and District National Health Service Trust (Transfer of Trust Property) Order 1995 (S.I. 1995/1090)
- St Michaels Mead Natural Gas Pipe-lines Order 1995 (S.I. 1995/1091)
- Charities (Trustee Investments Act 1961) Order 1995 (S.I. 1995/1092)
- Air Navigation (General) (Amendment) Regulations 1995 (S.I. 1995/1093)
- M25 Motorway (Junctions 10 to 15) (Variable Speed Limits) Regulations 1995 (S.I. 1995/1094)

== 1101–1200 ==
- East Glamorgan National Health Service Trust (Transfer of Trust Property) Order 1995 (S.I. 1995/1107)
- Medicines (Products for Human Use — Fees) Regulations 1995 (S.I. 1995/1116)
- North Wales Ambulance National Health Service Trust (Transfer of Trust Property) (No. 2) Order 1995 (S.I. 1995/1121)
- Dairy Products (Hygiene) (Charges) Regulations 1995 (S.I. 1995/1122)
- Special Trustees for the Royal Free Hospital (Transfer of Trust Property) Order 1995 (S.I. 1995/1123)
- Camden and Islington Community Health Services National Health Service Trust (Transfer of Trust Property) Order 1995 (S.I. 1995/1124)
- Whittington Hospital National Health Service Trust (Transfer of Trust Property) Order 1995 (S.I. 1995/1125)
- Special Trustees for the Middlesex Hospital (Transfer of Trust Property) Order 1995 (S.I. 1995/1126)
- North Yorkshire Health Authority (Transfer of Trust Property) Order 1995 (S.I. 1995/1127)
- Royal London Homoeopathic Hospital National Health Service Trust (Transfer of Trust Property) Order 1995 (S.I. 1995/1128)
- Special Trustees for University College Hospital (Transfer of Trust Property) Order 1995 (S.I. 1995/1129)
- London Priority Route (Amendment) Order 1995 (S.I. 1995/1130)
- Town and Country Planning (Crown Land Applications) Regulations 1995 (S.I. 1995/1139)
- Returning Officers (Parliamentary Constituencies) (Wales) Order 1995 (S.I. 1995/1142)
- Welfare Food (Amendment) Regulations 1995 (S.I. 1995/1143)
- A23 Trunk Road (Streatham High Road, Lambeth) (Prohibition of Use of Gaps in Central Reserve) Order 1995 (S.I. 1995/1144)
- Dual-Use and Related Goods (Export Control) (Suspension No. 2) Regulations 1995 (S.I. 1995/1151)
- Social Security (Recoupment) (Prolongation of Period for Furnishing of Certificate of Total Benefit) Order 1995 (S.I. 1995/1152)
- A19 Trunk Road (New Parks Bends Improvement) Order 1995 (S.I. 1995/1153)
- Street Works (Registers, Notices, Directionsand Designations) (Amendment No. 2) Regulations 1995 (S.I. 1995/1154)
- Redundancy Payments (Local Government) (Modification) (Amendment) Order 1995 (S.I. 1995/1157)
- A4 Trunk Road (Great West Road, Hounslow) (Prohibition of U-Turns) Order 1995 (S.I. 1995/1158)
- Moorland (Livestock Extensification) (Wales) Regulations 1995 (S.I. 1995/1159)
- Local Government Reorganisation (Wales) (Transitional Provisions No. 3) Order 1995 (S.I. 1995/1161)
- Motor Vehicles (Driving Licences) (Large Goods and Passenger-Carrying Vehicles) (Amendment) Regulations 1995 (S.I. 1995/1162)
- Companies Act 1989 Part II (Consequential Amendments) Regulations 1995 (S.I. 1995/1163)
- Vaccine Damage Payments (Specified Disease) Order 1995 (S.I. 1995/1164)
- A1 Trunk Road (Islington) Red Route Traffic Order 1993 Variation Order 1995 (S.I. 1995/1165)
- A1 Trunk Road (Islington) Red Route (Prohibition of U-Turn) Traffic Order 1995 (S.I. 1995/1166)
- London Cab (No. 2) Order 1995 (S.I. 1995/1181)
- Local Government Act 1988 (Defined Activities) (Exemption) (Housing Management) (England) Order 1995 (S.I. 1995/1182)
- Income Tax (Building Societies) (Dividends and Interest) (Amendment) Regulations 1995 (S.I. 1995/1184)
- Lloyd's Underwriters (Special Reserve Funds) (Amendment) Regulations 1995 (S.I. 1995/1185)
- Electrical Equipment for Explosive Atmospheres (Certification) (Amendment) Regulations 1995 (S.I. 1995/1186)
- Building Societies (Aggregation) (Amendment) Rules 1995 (S.I. 1995/1187)
- Building Societies (Designation of Qualifying Bodies) Order 1995 (S.I. 1995/1188)
- Building Societies (Provision of Services) Order 1995 (S.I. 1995/1189)
- Motor Vehicles (Driving Licences) (Amendment) Regulations 1995 (S.I. 1995/1200)

== 1201–1300 ==
- Road Vehicles (Construction and Use) (Amendment) (No. 3) Regulations 1995 (S.I. 1995/1201)
- Education (London Residuary Body) (Property Transfer) (Modification and Amendment) (No. 2) Order 1995 (S.I. 1995/1202)
- Customs Traders (Accounts and Records) Regulations 1995 (S.I. 1995/1203)
- Merchant Shipping (Survey and Certification) Regulations 1995 (S.I. 1995/1210)
- Life Assurance (Apportionment of Receipts of Participating Funds) (Applicable Percentage) (Amendment) Order 1995 (S.I. 1995/1211)
- Income Tax (Interest Relief) (Housing Associations) (Amendment) Regulations 1995 (S.I. 1995/1212)
- Income Tax (Interest Relief) (Amendment) Regulations 1995 (S.I. 1995/1213)
- Mackerel (Specified Sea Areas) (Prohibition of Fishing) (No. 2) Order 1995 (S.I. 1995/1214)
- Occupational Pension Schemes (Equal Access to Membership) Amendment Regulations 1995 (S.I. 1995/1215)
- Air Passenger Duty (Extended Schemes) Regulations 1995 (S.I. 1995/1216)
- Banking Coordination (Second Council Directive) (Amendment) Regulations 1995 (S.I. 1995/1217)
- Motor Cars (Driving Instruction) (Amendment) Regulations 1995 (S.I. 1995/1218)
- Advice and Assistance (Assistance by Way of Representation) (Scotland) Amendment Regulations 1995 (S.I. 1995/1219)
- Advice and Assistance (Financial Conditions) (Scotland) Regulations 1995 (S.I. 1995/1220)
- Civil Legal Aid (Financial Conditions) (Scotland) Regulations 1995 (S.I. 1995/1221)
- Criminal Legal Aid (Scotland) (Prescribed Proceedings) Amendment Regulations 1995 (S.I. 1995/1222)
- Income Tax (Employments) (Amendment No. 3) Regulations 1995 (S.I. 1995/1223)
- British Museum (Authorised Repositories) Order 1995 (S.I. 1995/1224)
- British Railways (Marylebone Diesel Depot) Order 1995 (S.I. 1995/1228)
- Social Fund Maternity and Funeral Expenses (General) Amendment Regulations 1995 (S.I. 1995/1229)
- Glan Hafren National Health Service Trust (Transfer of Trust Property) Order 1995 (S.I. 1995/1232)
- Powys Health Care National Health Service Trust (Transfer of Trust Property) Order 1995 (S.I. 1995/1233)
- South and East Wales Ambulance National Health Service Trust (Transfer of Trust Property) (No. 2) Order 1995 (S.I. 1995/1234)
- Bexley Community Health National Health Service Trust (Change of Name) Order 1995 (S.I. 1995/1235)
- Foxfield Light Railway Order 1995 (S.I. 1995/1236)
- Pipe-lines (Inquiries Procedure) Rules 1995 (S.I. 1995/1239)
- Education (Mandatory Awards) (Amendment) Regulations 1995 (S.I. 1995/1240)
- Education (Fees and Awards) (Amendment) Regulations 1995 (S.I. 1995/1241)
- North East Worcestershire Community Health Care National Health Service Trust (Transfer of Trust Property) Order 1995 (S.I. 1995/1242)
- Mancunian Community Health National Health Service Trust (Transfer of Trust Property) Order 1995 (S.I. 1995/1243)
- Wirral Community Healthcare National Health Service Trust (Transfer of Trust Property) Order 1995 (S.I. 1995/1244)
- Havering Hospitals National Health Service Trust (Transfer of Trust Property) Order 1995 (S.I. 1995/1245)
- BHB Community Health Care National Health Service Trust (Transfer of Trust Property) Order 1995 (S.I. 1995/1246)
- Haringey Health Care National Health Service Trust (Transfer of Trust Property) Order 1995 (S.I. 1995/1247)
- South Durham Health Care National Health Service Trust (Transfer of Trust Property) Order 1995 (S.I. 1995/1248)
- Dewsbury Health Care National Health Service Trust (Transfer of Trust Property) Order 1995 (S.I. 1995/1249)
- Consumer Credit (Exempt Agreements) (Amendment) Order 1995 (S.I. 1995/1250)
- Gas (Meters) (Amendment) Regulations 1995 (S.I. 1995/1251)
- Stanswood Bay Oyster Fishery (Variation) Order 1995 (S.I. 1995/1257)
- Calshot Oyster Fishery (Variation) Order 1995 (S.I. 1995/1258)
- Westcountry Ambulance Services National Health Service Trust (Transfer of Trust Property) Order 1995 (S.I. 1995/1259)
- Bishop Auckland Hospitals National Health Service Trust (Transfer of Trust Property) Order 1995 (S.I. 1995/1260)
- Darlington Memorial Hospital National Health Service Trust (Transfer of Trust Property) Order 1995 (S.I. 1995/1261)
- Worthing and Southlands Hospitals National Health Service Trust (Transfer of Trust Property) Order 1995 (S.I. 1995/1262)
- Mid Essex Community and Mental Health National Health Service Trust (Transfer of Trust Property) Order 1995 (S.I. 1995/1263)
- New Possibilities National Health Service Trust (Transfer of Trust Property) Order 1995 (S.I. 1995/1264)
- Salisbury Health Care National Health Service Trust (Transfer of Trust Property) Order 1995 (S.I. 1995/1265)
- Financial Services Act 1986 (Investment Advertisements) (Exemptions) Order 1995 (S.I. 1995/1266)
- Value Added Tax (Input Tax) (Amendment) (No 2) Order 1995 (S.I. 1995/1267)
- Value Added Tax (Special Provisions) Order 1995 (S.I. 1995/1268)
- Value Added Tax (Cars) (Amendment) Order 1995 (S.I. 1995/1269)
- Education (Fees and Awards) (Scotland) Amendment Regulations 1995 (S.I. 1995/1271)
- Local Review Committee (Scotland) Revocation Rules 1995 (S.I. 1995/1272)
- Parole Board (Scotland) Rules 1995 (S.I. 1995/1273)
- Value Added Tax (General) (Amendment) (No. 4) Regulations 1995 (S.I. 1995/1280)
- Income Tax (Stock Lending) (Amendment) Regulations 1995 (S.I. 1995/1283)
- Income Tax (Employments) (Amendment No. 4) Regulations 1995 (S.I. 1995/1284)
- Civil Aviation Authority (Borrowing Powers) Order 1995 (S.I. 1995/1289)
- Goods Vehicles (International Road Haulage Permits) (Revocation) Regulations 1995 (S.I. 1995/1290)
- Superannuation (Admission to the Principal Civil Service Pension Scheme) Order 1995 (S.I. 1995/1293)
- Department of Trade and Industry (Fees) (Amendment) Order 1995 (S.I. 1995/1294)
- Child Abduction and Custody (Parties to Conventions) (Amendment) (No. 3) Order 1995 (S.I. 1995/1295)
- Air Navigation (Isle of Man) (Revocation) Order 1995 (S.I. 1995/1296)
- Civil Aviation (Isle of Man) (Revocation) Order 1995 (S.I. 1995/1297)
- European Convention on Cinematographic Co-production (Amendment) Order 1995 (S.I. 1995/1298)
- Hovercraft (Application of Enactments) (Amendment) Order 1995 (S.I. 1995/1299)
- Northampton and Lamport Light Railway Order 1995 (S.I. 1995/1300)

== 1301–1400 ==
- Birmingham City Council (Birmingham & Fazeley Canal Bridge) Scheme 1994 Confirmation Instrument 1995 (S.I. 1995/1301)
- City Council of Sheffield (Inner Ring Road — Stage 1A Bridge) Scheme 1994 Confirmation Instrument 1995 (S.I. 1995/1310)
- Durham County Ambulance Service National Health Service Trust (Establishment) Amendment Order 1995 (S.I. 1995/1311)
- Law of Property (Miscellaneous Provisions) Act 1994 (Commencement No. 2) Order 1995 (S.I. 1995/1317)
- Motor Vehicles (Type Approval) (Great Britain) (Amendment) Regulations 1995 (S.I. 1995/1322)
- Motor Vehicles (Type Approval for Goods Vehicles) (Great Britain) (Amendment) Regulations 1995 (S.I. 1995/1323)
- Income Tax (Manufactured Overseas Dividends) (Amendment) Regulations 1995 (S.I. 1995/1324)
- Amalgamation of the Holme Common, River Burn and Stiffkey River Internal Drainage Boards Order 1995 (S.I. 1995/1325)
- Local Government Changes for England and Local Government Act 1988 (Competition) (Miscellaneous Amendment) Regulations 1995 (S.I. 1995/1326)
- Public Trustee (Notices Affecting Land) (Title on Death) Regulations 1995 (S.I. 1995/1330)
- Wireless Telegraphy (Licence Charges) Regulations 1995 (S.I. 1995/1331)
- Heathrow Express Railway (Transfer) Order 1995 (S.I. 1995/1332)
- Road Traffic (Special Parking Area) (Royal Borough of Kingston upon Thames) (Amendment No. 2) Order 1995 (S.I. 1995/1333)
- Road Traffic (Special Parking Area) (London Borough of Sutton) (Amendment No. 2) Order 1995 (S.I. 1995/1334)
- Road Traffic (Special Parking Area) (London Borough of Redbridge) (Amendment No. 2) Order 1995 (S.I. 1995/1335)
- Local Government (Direct Service Organisations) (Competition) (Amendment) Regulations 1995 (S.I. 1995/1336)
- Income-related Benefits Schemes (Miscellaneous Amendments) (No. 2) Regulations 1995 (S.I. 1995/1339)
- Local Authorities (Staff Transfer) (Scotland) Order 1995 (S.I. 1995/1340)
- Middlesbrough College (Incorporation) Order 1995 (S.I. 1995/1341)
- Middlesbrough College (Government) Regulations 1995 (S.I. 1995/1342)
- Teesside Tertiary College (Incorporation) Order 1995 (S.I. 1995/1343)
- Teesside Tertiary College (Government) Regulations 1995 (S.I. 1995/1344)
- Fair Trading Act (Amendment) (Newspaper mergers) Order 1995 (S.I. 1995/1351)
- Companies Act 1989 (Commencement No. 15 and Transitional and Savings Provisions) Order 1995 (S.I. 1995/1352)
- Land Registration (No. 2) Rules 1995 (S.I. 1995/1354)
- Land Charges (Amendment) Rules 1995 (S.I. 1995/1355)
- Building Regulations (Amendment) Regulations 1995 (S.I. 1995/1356)
- Wolverhampton Borough Council (Wednesfield Way) (Bridge over the Wyrley and Essington Canal) Scheme 1994 Confirmation Instrument 1995 (S.I. 1995/1357)
- Plant Health (Great Britain) (Amendment) Order 1995 (S.I. 1995/1358)
- Deposit-takers (Interest Payments) (Discretionary or Accumulation Trusts) Regulations 1995 (S.I. 1995/1370)
- Motor Vehicles (Off Road Events) Regulations 1995 (S.I. 1995/1371)
- Dairy Products (Hygiene) (Scotland) Regulations 1995 (S.I. 1995/1372)
- Inshore Fishing (Prohibition of Fishing for Cockles) (Scotland) Order 1995 (S.I. 1995/1373)
- Finance Act 1995, section 24, (Appointed Day) Order 1995 (S.I. 1995/1374)
- Public Telecommunication System Designation (Mercury Personal Communications Limited) Order 1995 (S.I. 1995/1375)
- Measuring Instruments (EEC Requirements) (Fees) (Amendment) Regulations 1995 (S.I. 1995/1376)
- Local Government (Direct Labour Organisations) (Competition) (Amendment) (Crown Courts) Regulations 1995 (S.I. 1995/1377)
- Criminal Justice and Public Order Act 1994 (Commencement No. 7) Order 1995 (S.I. 1995/1378)
- Curfew Order (Responsible Officer) (City of Manchester, Reading and Norfolk) Order 1995 (S.I. 1995/1379)
- Medicines (Products Other Than Veterinary Drugs) (Prescription Only) Amendment Order 1995 (S.I. 1995/1384)
- Value Added Tax (Special Provisions) Order 1995 (Amendment) Order 1995 (S.I. 1995/1385)
- Contracting Out (Functions of the Official Receiver) Order 1995 (S.I. 1995/1386)
- Building (Approved Inspectors etc.) (Amendment) Regulations 1995 (S.I. 1995/1387)
- Food Protection (Emergency Prohibitions) (Paralytic Shellfish Poisoning) Order 1995 (S.I. 1995/1388)
- Act of Sederunt (Fees of Solicitors in the Sheriff Court) (Amendment) 1995 (S.I. 1995/1395)
- Act of Sederunt (Rules of the Court of Session 1994 Amendment No.2) (Fees of Solicitors) 1995 (S.I. 1995/1396)
- Vehicle Excise Duty (Designation of Small Islands) Order 1995 (S.I. 1995/1397)
- Children (Secure Accommodation) AmendmentRegulations 1995 (S.I. 1995/1398)

== 1401–1500 ==
- Feeding Stuffs Regulations 1995 (S.I. 1995/1412)
- A41 Trunk Road (Detrunking of Slip Roads between the A41 and the A51, Chester) Order 1995 (S.I. 1995/1413)
- Food Protection (Emergency Prohibitions) (Paralytic Shellfish Poisoning) (No.2) Order 1995 (S.I. 1995/1422)
- Companies (Fees) (Amendment) Regulations 1995 (S.I. 1995/1423)
- Dual-Use and Related Goods (Export Control) (Amendment) Regulations 1995 (S.I. 1995/1424)
- Public Trustee (Fees) (Amendment) Order 1995 (S.I. 1995/1425)
- Merchant Shipping Act 1970 (Commencement No. 12) Order 1995 (S.I. 1995/1426)
- Merchant Shipping (Officer Nationality) Regulations 1995 (S.I. 1995/1427)
- Fishing Vessels (Certification of Deck Officers and Engineer Officers) (Amendment) Regulations 1995 (S.I. 1995/1428)
- Merchant Shipping (Certification of Deck and Marine Engineer Officers) (Amendment) Regulations 1995 (S.I. 1995/1429)
- Counterfeit and Pirated Goods (Customs)Regulations 1995 (S.I. 1995/1430)
- Passenger Transport Executives (Capital Finance) (Amendment) Order 1995 (S.I. 1995/1431)
- Deregulation and Contracting Out Act 1994 (Commencement No. 3) Order 1995 (S.I. 1995/1433)
- Hydrocarbons Licensing Directive Regulations 1995 (S.I. 1995/1434)
- Petroleum (Production) (Seaward Areas) (Amendment) Regulations 1995 (S.I. 1995/1435)
- Petroleum (Production) (Landward Areas) Regulations 1995 (S.I. 1995/1436)
- Road Traffic Act 1991 (Amendment of Section 76(3)) Order 1995 (S.I. 1995/1437)
- Civil Aviation (Route Charges for Navigation Services) (Second Amendment) Regulations 1995 (S.I. 1995/1438)
- Home-Grown Cereals Authority (Rate of Levy) Order 1995 (S.I. 1995/1439)
- Extraction Solvents in Food (Amendment) Regulations 1995 (S.I. 1995/1440)
- Price Marking (Amendment) Order 1995 (S.I. 1995/1441)
- Credit Institutions (Protection of Depositors) Regulations 1995 (S.I. 1995/1442)
- Pensions for Dependants of the Prime Minister or Speaker (Designated Provisions) Regulations 1995 (S.I. 1995/1443)
- Trade Marks (EC Measures Relating to Counterfeit Goods) Regulations 1995 (S.I. 1995/1444)
- Copyright (EC Measures Relating to Pirated Goods and Abolition of Restrictions on the Import of Goods) Regulations 1995 (S.I. 1995/1445)
- Suckler Cow Premium (Amendment) (No. 2) Regulations 1995 (S.I. 1995/1446)
- Counterfeit and Pirated Goods (Consequential Provisions) Regulations 1995 (S.I. 1995/1447)
- Further Education (Attribution of Surpluses and Deficits) (Margaret Danyers College) Regulations 1995 (S.I. 1995/1453)
- Coal Industry (Restructuring Grants) Order 1995 (S.I. 1995/1454)
- Vehicle Excise (Design Weight Certificate) Regulations 1995 (S.I. 1995/1455)
- Goods Vehicles (Plating and Testing) (Amendment) Regulations 1995 (S.I. 1995/1456)
- Motor Vehicles (Tests) (Amendment) Regulations 1995 (S.I. 1995/1457)
- Road Vehicles (Construction and Use) (Amendment) (No. 4) Regulations 1995 (S.I. 1995/1458)
- Inheritance Tax (Delivery of Accounts) (Scotland) Regulations 1995 (S.I. 1995/1459)
- Inheritance Tax (Delivery of Accounts) (Northern Ireland) Regulations 1995 (S.I. 1995/1460)
- Inheritance Tax (Delivery of Accounts) Regulations 1995 (S.I. 1995/1461)
- Northampton Community Healthcare National Health Service Trust (Transfer of Trust Property) Order 1995 (S.I. 1995/1462)
- Northampton General Hospital National Health Service Trust (Transfer of Trust Property) Order 1995 (S.I. 1995/1463)
- Royal Wolverhampton Hospitals National Health Service Trust (Transfer of Trust Property) Order 1995 (S.I. 1995/1464)
- Norfolk and Norwich Health Care National Health Service Trust (Transfer of Trust Property) Order 1995 (S.I. 1995/1465)
- Leicestershire Ambulance and Paramedic Service National Health Service Trust (Transfer of Trust Property) Order 1995 (S.I. 1995/1466)
- Alexandra Health Care National Health Service Trust (Transfer of Trust Property) Order 1995 (S.I. 1995/1467)
- Derbyshire Ambulance Service National Health Service Trust (Transfer of Trust Property) Order 1995 (S.I. 1995/1468)
- Calderdale Healthcare National Health Service Trust (Establishment) Amendment Order 1995 (S.I. 1995/1469)
- Road Vehicles (Registration and Licensing) (Amendment) Regulations 1995 (S.I. 1995/1470)
- Road Vehicles (Registration and Licensing) (Amendment) Regulations (Northern Ireland) 1995 (S.I. 1995/1471)
- Isles of Scilly Sea Fisheries District (Variation) Order 1995 (S.I. 1995/1472)
- Kent and Essex Sea Fisheries District (Variation) Order 1995 (S.I. 1995/1474)
- Police (Discipline) (Amendment) Regulations 1995 (S.I. 1995/1475)
- Roads (Transitional Powers) (Scotland) Order 1995 (S.I. 1995/1476)
- Coal Industry (Coal Mining Successor Companies Target Investment Limit) Order 1995 (S.I. 1995/1477)
- Cosmetic Products (Safety) Regulations 1995 (S.I. 1995/1478)
- Companies (Forms) (No. 2) Regulations 1995 (S.I. 1995/1479)
- Rheoliadau (Ffurflenni a Dogfenni Cymraeg) Cwmnïau (Rhif 2) 1995 (S.I. 1995/1480)
- Companies (Welsh Language Forms and Documents) (No.2) Regulations 1995 (S.I. 1995/1480)
- Hill Livestock (Compensatory Allowances) (Amendment) (No. 2) Regulations 1995 (S.I. 1995/1481)
- Cereal Seeds (Amendment) Regulations 1995 (S.I. 1995/1482)
- Pesticides (Maximum Residue Levels in Crops, Food and Feeding Stuffs) (Amendment) Regulations 1995 (S.I. 1995/1483)
- Goods Vehicles (Operators' Licences, Qualifications and Fees) (Amendment) Regulations 1995 (S.I. 1995/1488)
- Norwich Community Health Partnership National Health Service Trust (Transfer of Trust Property) Order 1995 (S.I. 1995/1489)
- Norfolk Mental Health Care National Health Service Trust (Transfer of Trust Property) Order 1995 (S.I. 1995/1490)
- Leicestershire Mental Health Service National Health Service Trust (Transfer of Trust Property) Order 1995 (S.I. 1995/1491)
- Bury Health Care National Health Service Trust (Transfer of Trust Property) Order 1995 (S.I. 1995/1492)
- Cumbria Ambulance Service National Health Service Trust (Transfer of Trust Property) Order 1995 (S.I. 1995/1493)
- North Lakeland Healthcare National Health Service Trust (Transfer of Trust Property) Order 1995 (S.I. 1995/1494)
- Value Added Tax (Tour Operators) (Amendment) Order 1995 (S.I. 1995/1495)
- Local Government Superannuation (Gratuities) Regulations 1995 (S.I. 1995/1497)

== 1501–1600 ==
- Asian Development Bank (Extension of Limit on Guarantees) Order 1995 (S.I. 1995/1502)
- Asian Development Bank (Further Payments to Capital Stock) Order 1995 (S.I. 1995/1503)
- British Coal Corporation (Change of Quorum) Regulations 1995 (S.I. 1995/1506)
- Coal Industry Act 1994 (Commencement No. 6) and Membership of the British Coal Corporation (Appointed Day) Order 1995 (S.I. 1995/1507)
- Rheoliadau (Ffurflenni a Dogfenni Cymraeg) Cwmnïau (Rhif 3) 1995 (S.I. 1995/1508)
- Companies (Welsh Language Forms and Documents) (No.3) Regulations 1995 (S.I. 1995/1508)
- Companies (Disqualification Orders) (Amendment) Regulations 1995 (S.I. 1995/1509)
- Local Government Reorganisation (Wales) (Consequential Amendments No. 2) Order 1995 (S.I. 1995/1510)
- Motor Cycle (EC Type Approval) Regulations 1995 (S.I. 1995/1513)
- Pneumoconiosis etc. (Workers' Compensation) (Payment of Claims) (Amendment) Regulations 1995 (S.I. 1995/1514)
- Local Government (Qualifications of Assessors) (Scotland) Order 1995 (S.I. 1995/1515)
- Companies Act 1985 (Disclosure of Remuneration for Non-Audit Work) (Amendment) Regulations 1995 (S.I. 1995/1520)
- Greater Manchester Passenger Transport Authority (Increase in Number of Members) Order 1995 (S.I. 1995/1522)
- Local Authorities (Capital Finance) (Amendment) Regulations 1995 (S.I. 1995/1526)
- Fraserburgh Harbour Revision Order 1995 (S.I. 1995/1527)
- West Yorkshire Metropolitan Ambulance Service National Health Service Trust (Transfer of Trust Property) Order 1995 (S.I. 1995/1534)
- Financial Services Act 1986 (Investment Advertisements) (Exemptions) (No. 2) Order 1995 (S.I. 1995/1536)
- Public Offers of Securities Regulations 1995 (S.I. 1995/1537)
- Financial Services Act 1986 (Commencement) (No. 13) Order 1995 (S.I. 1995/1538)
- Personal Equity Plan (Amendment) Regulations 1995 (S.I. 1995/1539)
- Section 19 Minibus (Designated Bodies) (Amendment) Order 1995 (S.I. 1995/1540)
- Transport and Works (Assessment of Environmental Effects) Regulations 1995 (S.I. 1995/1541)
- Eggs (Marketing Standards) Regulations 1995 (S.I. 1995/1544)
- Council Tax Limitation (England) (Maximum Amounts) Order 1995 (S.I. 1995/1545)
- Double Taxation Relief (Manufactured Overseas Dividends) (Amendment) Regulations 1995 (S.I. 1995/1551)
- Education (Grant-maintained and Grant-maintained Special Schools) (Finance) (Amendment) Regulations 1995 (S.I. 1995/1554)
- Betting and Gaming Duties (Payment) Regulations 1995 (S.I. 1995/1555)
- Dwr Cymru Cyfyngedig (Pipelaying and Other Works) (Code of Practice) Order 1995 (S.I. 1995/1556)
- Food Protection (Emergency Prohibitions) (Paralytic Shellfish Poisoning) (No.3) Order 1995 (S.I. 1995/1560)
- Education (School Performance Information) (England) (Amendment) Regulations 1995 (S.I. 1995/1561)
- Northern Ireland (Emergency and Prevention of Terrorism Provisions) (Continuance) Order 1995 (S.I. 1995/1566)
- Offshore Installations (Safety Zones) (No. 2) Order 1995 (S.I. 1995/1567)
- Ridge Danyers College (Incorporation) Order 1995 (S.I. 1995/1568)
- Ridge Danyers College (Government) Regulations 1995 (S.I. 1995/1569)
- Social Security (Contributions) Amendment (No. 5) Regulations 1995 (S.I. 1995/1570)
- National Health Service (Fund-Holding Practices) (Scotland) Amendment Regulations 1995 (S.I. 1995/1571)
- Building (Procedure) (Scotland) Amendment Regulations 1995 (S.I. 1995/1572)
- Education (National Curriculum) (Exceptions) (Wales) Regulations 1995 (S.I. 1995/1574)
- Offshore Installations (Safety Zones) (No. 3) Order 1995 (S.I. 1995/1575)
- Fisheries and Aquaculture Structures (Grants) Regulations 1995 (S.I. 1995/1576)
- Local Government Act 1988 (Defined Activities) (Exemption) (Hart District Council) Order 1995 (S.I. 1995/1581)
- County Court (Amendment No. 2) Rules 1995 (S.I. 1995/1582)
- County Court (Forms) (Amendment No. 2) Rules 1995 (S.I. 1995/1583)
- Insurance Premium Tax (Amendment) Regulations 1995 (S.I. 1995/1587)
- Walsgrave Hospitals National Health Service Trust (Transfer of Trust Property) Order 1995 (S.I. 1995/1588)
- Kettering General Hospital National Health Service Trust (Transfer of Trust Property) Order 1995 (S.I. 1995/1589)
- Tavistock and Portman National Health Service Trust (Transfer of Trust Property) Order 1995 (S.I. 1995/1590)
- Companies Act 1989 (Commencement No. 16) Order 1995 (S.I. 1995/1591)
- A3 Trunk Road (Kingston Vale, Kingston upon Thames) (Prescribed Routes) Order 1995 (S.I. 1995/1593)
- Kent County Council (Hale Street Medway Bridge) Scheme 1994 Confirmation Instrument 1995 (S.I. 1995/1594)
- Act of Sederunt (Registration Appeal Court) 1995 (S.I. 1995/1596)
- A312 Trunk Road (The Parkway, Hounslow) (Prescribed Routes) Order 1995 (S.I. 1995/1597)
- Prison (Amendment) (No. 2) Rules 1995 (S.I. 1995/1598)
- Young Offender Institution (Amendment) (No. 2) Rules 1995 (S.I. 1995/1599)

== 1601–1700 ==
- East Wiltshire Health Care National Health Service Trust (Transfer of Trust Property) Order 1995 (S.I. 1995/1602)
- Rockingham Forest National Health Service Trust (Transfer of Trust Property) Order 1995 (S.I. 1995/1603)
- Swindon and Marlborough National Health Service Trust (Transfer of Trust Property) Order 1995 (S.I. 1995/1604)
- Fishing Vessels (Safety Improvements) (Grants) Scheme 1995 (S.I. 1995/1609)
- Fishing Vessels (Decommissioning) Scheme 1995 (S.I. 1995/1610)
- Food Protection (Emergency Prohibitions) (Paralytic Shellfish Poisoning) (No.4) Order 1995 (S.I. 1995/1611)
- Personal Pension Schemes (Appropriate Schemes) Amendment Regulations 1995 (S.I. 1995/1612)
- Social Security (Income Support and Claims and Payments) Amendment Regulations 1995 (S.I. 1995/1613)
- Adoption (Designation of Overseas Adoptions) (Variation) (Scotland) Order 1995 (S.I. 1995/1614)
- Parliamentary Commissioner Order 1995 (S.I. 1995/1615)
- Child Abduction and Custody (Parties to Conventions) (Amendment) (No. 4) Order 1995 (S.I. 1995/1616)
- Consular Fees Order 1995 (S.I. 1995/1617)
- European Communities (Definition of Treaties) (Partnership and Co-operation Agreement between the European Communities and their Member States and the Russian Federation) Order 1995 (S.I. 1995/1618)
- European Communities (Definition of Treaties) (Partnership and Co-operation Agreement between the European Communities and their Member States, and Ukraine) Order 1995 (S.I. 1995/1619)
- Extradition (Drug Trafficking) (Falkland Islands and Gibraltar) Order 1995 (S.I. 1995/1620)
- South Georgia and South Sandwich Islands (Amendment) Order 1995 (S.I. 1995/1621)
- Armagh Observatory and Planetarium (Northern Ireland) Order 1995 (S.I. 1995/1622)
- Arts Council (Northern Ireland) Order 1995 (S.I. 1995/1623)
- European Convention on Extradition Order 1990 (Amendment) Order 1995 (S.I. 1995/1624)
- Historic Monuments and Archaeological Objects (Northern Ireland) Order 1995 (S.I. 1995/1625)
- Parliamentary Constituencies (England) Order 1995 (S.I. 1995/1626)
- Ports (Amendment) (Northern Ireland) Order 1995 (S.I. 1995/1627)
- Education (Inspectors of Schools in Wales) Order 1995 (S.I. 1995/1628)
- Gas Appliances (Safety) Regulations 1995 (S.I. 1995/1629)
- Food Protection (Emergency Prohibitions) (Paralytic Shellfish Poisoning) Order 1995 Partial Revocation Order 1995 (S.I. 1995/1630)
- Rent Officers (Additional Functions) Order 1995 (S.I. 1995/1642)
- Rent Officers (Additional Functions) (Scotland) Order 1995 (S.I. 1995/1643)
- Housing Benefit (General) Amendment Regulations 1995 (S.I. 1995/1644)
- National Lottery Charities Board (Increase in Membership) Order 1995 (S.I. 1995/1645)
- Package Travel, Package Holidays and Package Tours (Amendment) Regulations 1995 (S.I. 1995/1648)
- Children (Allocation of Proceedings) (Amendment) Order 1995 (S.I. 1995/1649)
- Dudley Priority Health National Health ServiceTrust (Transfer of Trust Property) Order 1995 (S.I. 1995/1657)
- Lincolnshire County Council (B1003/A57 Rope Walk to Carholme Road Link, Lincoln, Fossdyke Navigation and Brayford Pool Bridge) Scheme 1995 Confirmation Instrument 1995 (S.I. 1995/1658)
- Buying Agency Trading Funds (Extension) Order 1995 (S.I. 1995/1665)
- Value Added Tax (Input Tax) (Amendment) (No. 3) Order 1995 (S.I. 1995/1666)
- Value Added Tax (Cars) (Amendment) (No. 2) Order 1995 (S.I. 1995/1667)
- Value Added Tax (Supply of Services) (Amendment) Order 1995 (S.I. 1995/1668)
- Gaming (Small Charges) (Amendment) Order 1995 (S.I. 1995/1669)
- Teachers' Superannuation (Scotland) Amendment Regulations 1995 (S.I. 1995/1670)
- Active Implantable Medical Devices (Amendment and Transitional Provisions) Regulations 1995 (S.I. 1995/1671)
- Education (Special Educational Needs) (Amendment) Regulations 1995 (S.I. 1995/1673)
- Conditional Fee Agreements Order 1995 (S.I. 1995/1674)
- Conditional Fee Agreements Regulations 1995 (S.I. 1995/1675)
- Commissioners for Oaths (Prescribed Bodies) Regulations 1995 (S.I. 1995/1676)
- Severn Bridge (Amendment) Regulations 1995 (S.I. 1995/1677)
- Non-Domestic Rating (Chargeable Amounts) (Amendment No. 2) Regulations 1995 (S.I. 1995/1678)
- Non-Domestic Rating (Police Authorities) Order 1995 (S.I. 1995/1679)
- Pensions Increase (Civil Service Compensation Scheme 1994) Regulations 1995 (S.I. 1995/1680)
- Pensions Increase (Pension Schemes for Derek Compton Lewis) Regulations 1995 (S.I. 1995/1681)
- Pensions Increase (Pension Scheme for Mr Allan David Green) Regulations 1995 (S.I. 1995/1682)
- Pensions Increase (Civil Service Supplementary (Earnings Cap) Pension Scheme 1994) Regulations 1995 (S.I. 1995/1683)
- Department of Transport (Fees) (Amendment) Order 1995 (S.I. 1995/1684)
- Education (Grant) (Bishop Perowne High School) Regulations 1995 (S.I. 1995/1688)
- A12 Trunk Road (Redbridge) (No. 1) Red Route Experimental Traffic Order 1995 (S.I. 1995/1692)
- A316 Trunk Road (Hounslow) Red Route Traffic Order 1995 (S.I. 1995/1693)
- A316 Trunk Road (Richmond) (No. 1) Red Route Experimental Traffic Order 1995 (S.I. 1995/1694)
- A12 Trunk Road (Redbridge) Red Route Experimental Traffic Order 1995 (S.I. 1995/1695)
- A1400 Trunk Road (Redbridge) Red Route Experimental Traffic Order 1995 (S.I. 1995/1696)
- A316 Trunk Road (Richmond) Red Route (Clearway) Traffic Order 1995 (S.I. 1995/1697)
- A316 Trunk Road (Hounslow) Red Route (Clearway) Traffic Order 1995 (S.I. 1995/1698)
- A406 Trunk Road (Newham and Barking and Dagenham) Red Route Experimental Traffic Order 1995 (S.I. 1995/1699)
- A13 Trunk Road (Barking and Dagenham) Red Route Experimental Traffic Order 1995 (S.I. 1995/1700)

== 1701–1800 ==
- A13 Trunk Road (Newham) Red Route Experimental Traffic Order 1995 (S.I. 1995/1701)
- A10 Trunk Road (Haringey) Red Route Experimental Traffic Order 1995 (S.I. 1995/1702)
- A13 Trunk Road (Havering) Red Route Experimental Traffic Order 1995 (S.I. 1995/1703)
- Education (Funding for Teacher Training) Designation Order 1995 (S.I. 1995/1704)
- Education (Grants for Education Support and Training) (England) (Amendment) Regulations 1995 (S.I. 1995/1705)
- Football Spectators (Seating) Order 1995 (S.I. 1995/1706)
- Local Government Act 1988 (Defined Activities) (Exemption) (Allerdale Borough Council, St Edmundsbury Borough Council and Uttlesford District Council) Order 1995 (S.I. 1995/1707)
- Nitrate Sensitive Areas (Amendment) Regulations 1995 (S.I. 1995/1708)
- Royal Orthopaedic Hospital National Health Service Trust (Establishment) Amendment Order 1995 (S.I. 1995/1709)
- Acklam Sixth Form College, Middlesbrough and Kirby College of Further Education, Middlesbrough (Dissolution) Order 1995 (S.I. 1995/1710)
- Longlands College of Further Education, Middlesbrough and Marton Sixth Form College Middlesbrough (Dissolution) Order 1995 (S.I. 1995/1711)
- St Mary's Music School (Aided Places) Regulations 1995 (S.I. 1995/1712)
- Education (Assisted Places) (Scotland) Regulations 1995 (S.I. 1995/1713)
- Food Protection (Emergency Prohibitions) (Paralytic Shellfish Poisoning) (No.5) Order 1995 (S.I. 1995/1714)
- International Carriage of Perishable Foodstuffs (Amendment) Regulations 1995 (S.I. 1995/1716)
- INDUSTRIAL TRIBUNALS (ENFORCEMENT OF ORDERS UNDER THE CIVIL JURISDICTION AND JUDGMENTS ACT 1982) (SCOTLAND) REGULATIONS 1995 (S.I. 1995/1717)
- Foreign Companies (Execution of Documents) (Amendment) Regulations 1995 (S.I. 1995/1729)
- Insurance Companies (Taxation of Reinsurance Business) Regulations 1995 (S.I. 1995/1730)
- Mancunian Community Health National HealthService Trust (Transfer of Trust Property) (No. 2) Order 1995 (S.I. 1995/1731)
- South Manchester University Hospitals National Health Service Trust (Transfer of Trust Property) Order 1995 (S.I. 1995/1732)
- Tameside and Glossop Acute Services National Health Service Trust (Transfer of Trust Property) Order 1995 (S.I. 1995/1733)
- Tameside and Glossop Communityand Priority Services National Health Service Trust (Transfer of Trust Property) Order 1995 (S.I. 1995/1734)
- Gloucestershire Royal National Health Service Trust (Transfer of Trust Property) Order 1995 (S.I. 1995/1735)
- North Manchester Healthcare National Health Service Trust (Transfer of Trust Property) Order 1995 (S.I. 1995/1736)
- Food Protection (Emergency Prohibitions) (Paralytic Shellfish Poisoning) (No.6) Order 1995 (S.I. 1995/1737)
- Arable Area Payments Regulations 1995 (S.I. 1995/1738)
- Education Authority Bursaries (Scotland) Regulations 1995 (S.I. 1995/1739)
- Social Security Benefits (Miscellaneous Amendments) Regulations 1995 (S.I. 1995/1742)
- Education (School Teachers' Pay and Conditions) (No. 2) Order 1995 (S.I. 1995/1743)
- Cleveland (Further Provision) Order 1995 (S.I. 1995/1747)
- Local Government Changes for England (Miscellaneous Provision) Regulations 1995 (S.I. 1995/1748)
- Combined Probation Areas (Greater Manchester) Order 1995 (S.I. 1995/1749)
- Gaming (Small Charges) (Scotland) Variation Order 1995 (S.I. 1995/1750)
- Transcripts of Criminal Proceedings (Scotland) Amendment Order 1995 (S.I. 1995/1751)
- Training for Work (Scottish Enterprise and Highlands and Islands Enterprise Programmes) Order 1995 (S.I. 1995/1752)
- Equine Viral Arteritis Order 1995 (S.I. 1995/1755)
- Food Safety (General Food Hygiene) Regulations 1995 (S.I. 1995/1763)
- South Kent Community Healthcare National Health Service Trust (Transfer of Trust Property) Order 1995 (S.I. 1995/1766)
- Local Government Act 1988 (Defined Activities) (Exemption) (Allerdale Borough Council, St Edmundsbury Borough Council and Uttlesford District Council) Order 1995 (S.I. 1995/1767)
- Birmingham Heartlands Hospital National Health Service Trust (Transfer of Trust Property) Order 1995 (S.I. 1995/1768)
- Buckinghamshire (Borough of Milton Keynes) (Structural Change) Order 1995 (S.I. 1995/1769)
- East Sussex (Boroughs of Brighton and Hove) (Structural Change) Order 1995 (S.I. 1995/1770)
- Dorset (Boroughs of Poole and Bournemouth) (Structural Change) Order 1995 (S.I. 1995/1771)
- Durham (Borough of Darlington) (Structural Change) Order 1995 (S.I. 1995/1772)
- Derbyshire (City of Derby) (Structural Change) Order 1995 (S.I. 1995/1773)
- Wiltshire (Borough of Thamesdown) (Structural Change) Order 1995 (S.I. 1995/1774)
- Hampshire (Cities of Portsmouth and Southampton) (Structural Change) Order 1995 (S.I. 1995/1775)
- Bedfordshire (Borough of Luton) (Structural Change) Order 1995 (S.I. 1995/1776)
- Travellers' Reliefs (Fuel and Lubricants) Order 1995 (S.I. 1995/1777)
- Finance Act 1995 (Contractual Savings Schemes) (Appointed Day) Order 1995 (S.I. 1995/1778)
- Staffordshire (City of Stoke-on-Trent) (Structural and Boundary Changes) Order 1995 (S.I. 1995/1779)
- Training for Work (Miscellaneous Provisions) Order 1995 (S.I. 1995/1780)

== 1801–1900 ==
- Social Security (Adjudication) Regulations 1995 (S.I. 1995/1801)
- Merchant Shipping and Fishing Vessels (Medical Stores) Regulations 1995 (S.I. 1995/1802)
- Merchant Shipping (Ships' Doctors) Regulations 1995 (S.I. 1995/1803)
- Units of Measurement Regulations 1995 (S.I. 1995/1804)
- County Council of Norfolk (Reconstruction of Welney Suspension Bridge) Scheme 1994 Confirmation Instrument 1995 (S.I. 1995/1805)
- Building Societies (Limits on Transactions with Directors) Order 1995 (S.I. 1995/1872)
- Building Societies (Non-Retail Funds and Deposits) (Limit on Election) Order 1995 (S.I. 1995/1873)
- Building Societies (Mergers) (Amendment) Regulations 1995 (S.I. 1995/1874)
- Act of Adjournal (Consolidation Amendment) (Supervised Release Orders) 1995 (S.I. 1995/1875)
- Act of Sederunt (Proceedings in the Sheriff Court under the Debtors (Scotland) Act 1987) (Amendment) 1995 (S.I. 1995/1876)
- Act of Sederunt (Consumer Credit Act 1974) 1985 (Amendment) 1995 (S.I. 1995/1877)
- Local Government (Transitional Provisions) (Scotland) Order 1995 (S.I. 1995/1878)
- Aberdeen and Grampian Tourist Board Scheme Order 1995 (S.I. 1995/1879)
- Angus and City of Dundee Tourist Board Scheme Order 1995 (S.I. 1995/1880)
- Argyll, the Isles, Loch Lomond, Stirling and Trossachs Tourist Board Scheme Order 1995 (S.I. 1995/1881)
- Ayrshire and Arran Tourist Board Scheme Order 1995 (S.I. 1995/1882)
- Dumfries and Galloway Tourist Board Scheme Order 1995 (S.I. 1995/1883)
- Edinburgh and Lothians Tourist Board Scheme Order 1995 (S.I. 1995/1884)
- Greater Glasgow and Clyde Valley Tourist Board Scheme Order 1995 (S.I. 1995/1885)
- Highlands of Scotland Tourist Board Scheme Order 1995 (S.I. 1995/1886)
- Kingdom of Fife Tourist Board Scheme Order 1995 (S.I. 1995/1887)
- Orkney Tourist Board Scheme Order 1995 (S.I. 1995/1888)
- Perthshire Tourist Board Scheme Order 1995 (S.I. 1995/1889)
- Scottish Borders Tourist Board Scheme Order 1995 (S.I. 1995/1890)
- Shetland Tourist Board Scheme Order 1995 (S.I. 1995/1891)
- Western Isles Tourist Board Scheme Order 1995 (S.I. 1995/1892)
- Merchant Shipping (Fees) Regulations 1995 (S.I. 1995/1893)
- Local Government (Relevant Date) (Scotland) Order 1995 (S.I. 1995/1894)
- Northern Ireland Act 1974 (Interim Period Extension) Order 1995 (S.I. 1995/1895)
- Northern Ireland (Emergency Provisions) Act 1991 (Codes of Practice) Order 1995 (S.I. 1995/1896)
- Civil Courts (Amendment) Order 1995 (S.I. 1995/1897)
- Local Government etc. (Scotland) Act 1994 (Commencement No.4) Order 1995 (S.I. 1995/1898)
- Merchant Shipping (Seamen's Documents) (Amendment) Regulations 1995 (S.I. 1995/1900)

== 1901–2000 ==
- Education (School Performance Information) (Wales) Regulations 1995 (S.I. 1995/1904)
- Non-automatic Weighing Instruments (EEC Requirements) Regulations 1995 (S.I. 1995/1907)
- Magistrates' Courts (Forms) (Amendment) Rules 1995 (S.I. 1995/1909)
- Medway National Health Service Trust (Transfer of Trust Property) Order 1995 (S.I. 1995/1910)
- Kent Ambulance National Health Service Trust (Transfer of Trust Property) Order 1995 (S.I. 1995/1911)
- Mid Kent Healthcare National Health Service Trust (Transfer of Trust Property) Order 1995 (S.I. 1995/1912)
- North Kent Healthcare National Health Service Trust (Transfer of Trust Property) Order 1995 (S.I. 1995/1913)
- Royal Victoria Infirmary and Associated Hospitals National Health Service Trust (Transfer of Trust Property) Order 1995 (S.I. 1995/1914)
- Local Government Act 1988 (Competition) (Defined Activities) Order 1995 (S.I. 1995/1915)
- Friendly Societies (Modification of the Corporation Tax Acts) (Amendment) Regulations 1995 (S.I. 1995/1916)
- Broadcasting (Restrictions on the Holding of Licences) (Amendment) Order 1995 (S.I. 1995/1924)
- Broadcasting (Independent Productions) (Amendment) Order 1995 (S.I. 1995/1925)
- Ridge College, Stockport and Margaret Danyers College (Dissolution) Order 1995 (S.I. 1995/1927)
- Specified Bovine Offal Order 1995 (S.I. 1995/1928)
- Tax-exempt Special Savings Account (Amendment) Regulations 1995 (S.I. 1995/1929)
- Licensing (Sunday Hours) Act 1995 (Commencement) Order 1995 (S.I. 1995/1930)
- Fees in the Registers of Scotland Order 1995 (S.I. 1995/1945)
- A30 Trunk Road (Kennards House Junction Improvement and Slip Roads) Order 1995 (S.I. 1995/1946)
- Satellite Communications Services Regulations 1995 (S.I. 1995/1947)
- Local Government Elections (Changes to the Franchise and Qualification of Members) Regulations 1995 (S.I. 1995/1948)
- Waste Management Licensing (Amendment No. 2) Regulations 1995 (S.I. 1995/1950)
- Employment Protection (Increase of Limits) Order 1995 (S.I. 1995/1953)
- Housing Benefit (Permitted Totals) Order 1995 (S.I. 1995/1954)
- Bovine Offal (Prohibition) (England, Wales and Scotland) (Revocation) Regulations 1995 (S.I. 1995/1955)
- Offshore Installations (Safety Zones) (No. 4) Order 1995 (S.I. 1995/1956)
- Criminal Justice and Public Order Act 1994 (Commencement No. 8 and Transitional Provision) Order 1995 (S.I. 1995/1957)
- Criminal Justice Act 1993 (Commencement No. 9) Order 1995 (S.I. 1995/1958)
- Legal Officers (Annual Fees) Order 1995 (S.I. 1995/1959)
- Parochial Fees Order 1995 (S.I. 1995/1960)
- Ecclesiastical Judges and Legal Officers (Fees) Order 1995 (S.I. 1995/1961)
- European Convention on Extradition Order 1990 (Amendment) (No. 2) Order 1995 (S.I. 1995/1962)
- European Convention on CinematographicCo-production (Amendment) (No. 2) Order 1995 (S.I. 1995/1963)
- Army, Air Force and Naval Discipline Acts (Continuation) Order 1995 (S.I. 1995/1964)
- Naval Medical Compassionate Fund (Amendment) Order 1995 (S.I. 1995/1965)
- Misuse of Drugs Act 1971 (Modification) Order 1995 (S.I. 1995/1966)
- Drug Trafficking Act 1994 (Enforcement of Northern Ireland Confiscation Orders) Order 1995 (S.I. 1995/1967)
- Criminal Justice Act 1988 (Enforcement of Northern Ireland Confiscation Orders) Order 1995 (S.I. 1995/1968)
- Appropriation (No. 2) (Northern Ireland) Order 1995 (S.I. 1995/1969)
- Air Navigation (No. 2) Order 1995 (S.I. 1995/1970)
- Strathclyde Passenger Transport Area (Designation) Order 1995 (S.I. 1995/1971)
- Local Government Act 1988 (Defined Activities) (Competition) (Scotland) Amendment Regulations 1995 (S.I. 1995/1972)
- Local Government Act 1988 (Defined Activities) (Cleaning of Police Buildings) (England and Wales) Regulations 1995 (S.I. 1995/1973)
- Local Government Reorganisation (Capital Money) (Greater London) (Amendment) Order 1995 (S.I. 1995/1974)
- Value Added Tax (Refund of Tax) Order 1995 (S.I. 1995/1978)
- Venture Capital Trust Regulations 1995 (S.I. 1995/1979)
- Trade Union and Labour Relations (Northern Ireland) Order 1995 (S.I. 1995/1980)
- Local Authorities (Payment of Levy on Disposals) Regulations 1995 (S.I. 1995/1981)
- Local Authorities (Capital Finance and Approved Investments) (Amendment No. 2) Regulations 1995 (S.I. 1995/1982)
- Environment Act 1995 (Commencement No. 1) Order 1995 (S.I. 1995/1983)
- A87 Extension (Skye Bridge Crossing) Special Road Regulations 1995 (S.I. 1995/1984)
- Local Government Pension Scheme (Local Government Reorganisation in Wales) Regulations 1995 (S.I. 1995/1985)
- Contracting Out (Highway Functions) Order 1995 (S.I. 1995/1986)
- Legal Advice and Assistance (Scope) (Amendment) Regulations 1995 (S.I. 1995/1987)
- Export and Investment Guarantees (Limit on Foreign Currency Commitments) Order 1995 (S.I. 1995/1988)
- Plant Health (Forestry) (Great Britain) (Amendment) Order 1995 (S.I. 1995/1989)
- Safety of Sports Grounds (Designation) Order 1995 (S.I. 1995/1990)
- Dudley Group of Hospitals National Health ServiceTrust (Transfer of Trust Property) Order 1995 (S.I. 1995/1991)
- Furness Hospitals National Health Service Trust (Transfer of Trust Property) Order 1995 (S.I. 1995/1992)
- Severn National Health Service Trust (Transfer of Trust Property) Order 1995 (S.I. 1995/1993)
- South Cumbria Community and Mental Health National Health Service Trust (Transfer of Trust Property) Order 1995 (S.I. 1995/1994)
- Westmorland Hospitals National Health Service Trust (Transfer of Trust Property) Order 1995 (S.I. 1995/1995)

== 2001–2100 ==
- Teachers' Superannuation (Amendment) Regulations 1995 (S.I. 1995/2004)
- Mines Miscellaneous Health and Safety Provisions Regulations 1995 (S.I. 1995/2005)
- Local Government (Publication of Staffing Information) (England) Regulations 1995 (S.I. 1995/2006)
- Western Isles Islands Council (Various Harbours Jurisdiction and Byelaws) Harbour Revision Order 1995 (S.I. 1995/2007)
- Children (Short-term Placements) (Miscellaneous Amendments) Regulations 1995 (S.I. 1995/2015)
- Education (Assisted Places) Regulations 1995 (S.I. 1995/2016)
- Education (Assisted Places) (Incidental Expenses) Regulations 1995 (S.I. 1995/2017)
- Education (Grants) (Music, Ballet and Choir Schools) Regulations 1995 (S.I. 1995/2018)
- Sex Discrimination (Designated Educational Establishments) (Revocation) Order 1995 (S.I. 1995/2019)
- Police (Amendment No. 2) Regulations 1995 (S.I. 1995/2020)
- Prisoners (Return to Custody) Act 1995 (Commencement) Order 1995 (S.I. 1995/2021)
- Church of England (Legal Aid) Rules 1995 (S.I. 1995/2034)
- Quarries Miscellaneous Health and Safety Provisions Regulations 1995 (S.I. 1995/2036)
- North East London Education Association Order 1995 (S.I. 1995/2037)
- Borehole Sites and Operations Regulations 1995 (S.I. 1995/2038)
- Warble Fly (Scotland) Amendment Order 1995 (S.I. 1995/2042)
- Town and Country Planning (Simplified Planning Zones) (Scotland) Regulations 1995 (S.I. 1995/2043)
- Town and Country Planning (Simplified Planning Zones) (Scotland) Order 1995 (S.I. 1995/2044)
- Planning and Compensation Act 1991 (Commencement No.18 and Transitional Provision) (Scotland) Order 1995 (S.I. 1995/2045)
- Food Protection (Emergency Prohibitions) (Paralytic Shellfish Poisoning) (No.6) Order 1995 Revocation Order 1995 (S.I. 1995/2046)
- Misuse of Drugs (Designation) (Variation) Order 1995 (S.I. 1995/2047)
- Misuse of Drugs (Amendment) Regulations 1995 (S.I. 1995/2048)
- Financial Markets and Insolvency (Money Market) Regulations 1995 (S.I. 1995/2049)
- Income Tax (Dealers in Securities) (Tradepoint) Regulations 1995 (S.I. 1995/2050)
- Stamp Duty Reserve Tax (Tradepoint) Regulations 1995 (S.I. 1995/2051)
- Income Tax (Manufactured Dividends) (Tradepoint) Regulations 1995 (S.I. 1995/2052)
- Mortgage Indemnities (Recognised Bodies) (No. 2) Order 1995 (S.I. 1995/2053)
- Repeal of Offensive Trades or Businesses Provisions Order 1995 (S.I. 1995/2054)
- Charities (Dormant Accounts) (Scotland) Regulations 1995 (S.I. 1995/2056)
- Dartford-Thurrock Crossing Tolls Order 1995 (S.I. 1995/2059)
- DARTFORD-THURROCK CROSSING (AMENDMENT) REGULATIONS 1995 (S.I. 1995/2060)
- Returning Officers (Parliamentary Constituencies) (England) Order 1995 (S.I. 1995/2061)
- Education (Further Education Institutions Information) (England) Regulations 1995 (S.I. 1995/2065)
- Housing (Right to Buy) (Priority of Charges) (No. 2) Order 1995 (S.I. 1995/2066)
- A43 Trunk Road (Whitfield Turn to Brackley Hatch Dualling) (Detrunking) Order 1995 (S.I. 1995/2067)
- A43 Trunk Road (Whitfield Turn to Brackley Hatch Dualling and Slip Roads) Order 1995 (S.I. 1995/2068)
- Education (School Information) (Wales) (Amendment) Regulations 1995 (S.I. 1995/2070)
- Education (National Curriculum) (Assessment Arrangements for the Core Subjects) (Key Stage 1) (England) Order 1995 (S.I. 1995/2071)
- Education (National Curriculum) (Assessment Arrangements for the Core Subjects) (Key Stage 2) (England) Order 1995 (S.I. 1995/2072)
- Education (National Curriculum) (Assessment Arrangements for the Core Subjects) (Key Stage 3) (England) Order 1995 (S.I. 1995/2073)
- Local Government Act 1988 (Security Work) (Exemption) (England) Order 1995 (S.I. 1995/2074)
- Motor Vehicles (Driving Licences) (Large Goods and Passenger-Carrying Vehicles) (Amendment) (No. 2) Regulations 1995 (S.I. 1995/2075)
- Motor Vehicles (Driving Licences) (Amendment) (No. 2) Regulations 1995 (S.I. 1995/2076)
- Education (Wyvern College, Salisbury) (Exemption from Pay and Conditions Orders) Order 1995 (S.I. 1995/2087)
- National Lottery etc. Act 1993 (Amendment of Section 23) Order 1995 (S.I. 1995/2088)
- Education (Pupil Registration) Regulations 1995 (S.I. 1995/2089)
- Education (School Attendance Order) Regulations 1995 (S.I. 1995/2090)
- Rhondda College (Dissolution) Order 1995 (S.I. 1995/2091)
- Companies (Summary Financial Statement) Regulations 1995 (S.I. 1995/2092)
- Patents Rules 1995 (S.I. 1995/2093)
- Nitrate Sensitive Areas (Amendment) (No. 2) Regulations 1995 (S.I. 1995/2095)
- Local Government Act 1988 (Competition) (Personnel Services) (Fire and Civil Defence Authorities) (England) Regulations 1995 (S.I. 1995/2100)

== 2101–2200 ==
- Local Government Act 1988 (Competition) (Personnel Services) (England) Regulations 1995 (S.I. 1995/2101)
- Fire Services (Appointments and Promotion) (Amendment) Regulations 1995 (S.I. 1995/2109)
- Fire Services (Appointments and Promotion) (Scotland) Amendment Regulations 1995 (S.I. 1995/2110)
- London–Fishguard Trunk Road (A40) (Fishguard Western By-Pass) Order 1995 (S.I. 1995/2124)
- Agricultural Holdings (Units of Production) Order 1995 (S.I. 1995/2125)
- Street Works (Registers, Notices, Directions and Designations) (Amendment No. 3) Regulations 1995 (S.I. 1995/2128)
- Central Manchester Healthcare National Health Service Trust (Transfer of Trust Property) Order 1995 (S.I. 1995/2129)
- Police (Scotland) Amendment (No.3) Regulations 1995 (S.I. 1995/2131)
- Oswestry Light Railway Order 1995 (S.I. 1995/2142)
- Great Central (Nottingham) Railway Order 1995 (S.I. 1995/2143)
- Civil Aviation (Canadian Navigation Services) (Amendment) Regulations 1995 (S.I. 1995/2144)
- Swansea Bay Mussel Fishery Order 1995 (S.I. 1995/2145)
- Dolgellau to South of Birkenhead Trunk Road (A494) (Improvement at Nantclwyd Bridge) Order 1995 (S.I. 1995/2146)
- Medicines (Administration of Radioactive Substances) Amendment Regulations 1995 (S.I. 1995/2147)
- Wild Game Meat (Hygiene and Inspection) Regulations 1995 (S.I. 1995/2148)
- Greater Manchester Ambulance Service National Health Service Trust (Transfer of Trust Property) Order 1995 (S.I. 1995/2149)
- Warwickshire Ambulance Service National Health Service Trust (Transfer of Trust Property) Order 1995 (S.I. 1995/2150)
- Distraint by Collectors (Fees, Costs and Charges) (Amendment) Regulations 1995 (S.I. 1995/2151)
- Environmental Protection Act 1990 (Commencement No. 17) Order 1995 (S.I. 1995/2152)
- Social Security (Attendance and Disability Living Allowances) Amendment Regulations 1995 (S.I. 1995/2162)
- Patents (Fees) Rules 1995 (S.I. 1995/2164)
- Registered Designs (Fees) Rules 1995 (S.I. 1995/2165)
- M4 Motorway (Severn Bridge) (Speed Limit) Regulations 1995 (S.I. 1995/2168)
- Goods Vehicles (Licensing of Operators) Act 1995(Commencement and Transitional Provisions) Order 1995 (S.I. 1995/2181)
- A650 Trunk Road (Crossflatts Roundabout To Keighley Road Roundabout) (Detrunking) Order 1995 (S.I. 1995/2182)
- Social Security (Unemployment, Sickness and Invalidity Benefit) Amendment Regulations 1995 (S.I. 1995/2192)
- Conon Salmon Fishery District Designation Order 1995 (S.I. 1995/2193)
- Alness Salmon Fishery District Designation Order 1995 (S.I. 1995/2194)
- Land Drainage Improvement Works (Assessment of Environmental Effects) (Amendment) Regulations 1995 (S.I. 1995/2195)
- Food Safety (Temperature Control) Regulations 1995 (S.I. 1995/2200)

== 2201–2300 ==
- County Council of The Royal County of Berkshire (A329(M) Loddon Bridge Connecting Road) Special Road Scheme 1995 Confirmation Instrument 1995 (S.I. 1995/2201)
- Rural Development Grants (Agriculture) (No. 2) Regulations 1995 (S.I. 1995/2202)
- Rules of the Supreme Court (Amendment) 1995 (S.I. 1995/2206)
- Education (National Curriculum) (Assessment Arrangements for English, Welsh, Mathematics and Science) (Key Stage 1) (Wales) Order 1995 (S.I. 1995/2207)
- Education (National Curriculum) (Assessment Arrangements for English, Welsh, Mathematics and Science) (Key Stage 2) (Wales) Order 1995 (S.I. 1995/2208)
- Education (National Curriculum) (Assessment Arrangements for English, Welsh, Mathematics and Science) (Key Stage 3) (Wales) Order 1995 (S.I. 1995/2209)
- Road Vehicles (Construction and Use) (Amendment) (No. 5) Regulations 1995 (S.I. 1995/2210)
- Aberdeen and Grampian Tourist Board Scheme Amendment Order 1995 (S.I. 1995/2211)
- Angus and City of Dundee Tourist Board Scheme Amendment Order 1995 (S.I. 1995/2212)
- Argyll, the Isles, Loch Lomond, Stirling and Trossachs Tourist Board Scheme Amendment Order 1995 (S.I. 1995/2213)
- Scottish Borders Tourist Board Scheme Amendment Order 1995 (S.I. 1995/2214)
- A12 Trunk Road (Eastern Avenue, Redbridge) (Prescribed Route) Order 1995 (S.I. 1995/2215)
- A3 Trunk Road (Beverley Way, Merton) (Prohibition of Left Turn) Order 1995 (S.I. 1995/2216)
- Ayrshire and Arran Tourist Board Scheme Amendment Order 1995 (S.I. 1995/2232)
- Dumfries and Galloway Tourist Board Scheme Amendment Order 1995 (S.I. 1995/2233)
- Edinburgh and Lothians Tourist Board Scheme Amendment Order 1995 (S.I. 1995/2234)
- Greater Glasgow and Clyde Valley Tourist Board Scheme Amendment Order 1995 (S.I. 1995/2235)
- Highlands of Scotland Tourist Board Scheme Amendment Order 1995 (S.I. 1995/2236)
- Kingdom of Fife Tourist Board Scheme Amendment Order 1995 (S.I. 1995/2237)
- Orkney Tourist Board Scheme Amendment Order 1995 (S.I. 1995/2238)
- Perthshire Tourist Board Scheme Amendment Order 1995 (S.I. 1995/2239)
- Shetland Tourist Board Scheme Amendment Order 1995 (S.I. 1995/2240)
- Western Isles Tourist Board Scheme Amendment Order 1995 (S.I. 1995/2241)
- A13 Trunk Road (Tower Hamlets) Red Route Experimental Traffic Order 1995 (S.I. 1995/2245)
- A406 Trunk Road (Enfield) Red Route Experimental Traffic Order 1995 (S.I. 1995/2246)
- Stonebridge Housing Action Trust (Transfer of Property) Order 1995 (S.I. 1995/2248)
- Local Government Pension Scheme (Pensionable Remuneration Amendment) Regulations 1995 (S.I. 1995/2249)
- Town and Country Planning (Environmental Assessment and Unauthorised Development) Regulations 1995 (S.I. 1995/2258)
- Town and Country Planning (Determination of Appeals by Appointed Persons) (Prescribed Classes) (Amendment) Regulations 1995 (S.I. 1995/2259)
- East Midlands Enterprise Zones (Mansfield) (Designation) Order 1995 (S.I. 1995/2260)
- Royal Scottish Academy of Music and Drama (Scotland) Order of Council 1995 (S.I. 1995/2261)
- Acquisition of Land (Rate of Interest after Entry) Regulations 1995 (S.I. 1995/2262)
- Income Support (General) Amendment and Transitional Regulations 1995 (S.I. 1995/2287)
- Gaming Act (Variation of Monetary Limits) (No. 2) Order 1995 (S.I. 1995/2288)
- Civil Aviation Authority (Economic Regulation of Airports) (Northern Ireland) Regulations 1995 (S.I. 1995/2294)
- Criminal Justice (Scotland) Act 1995 (Commencement No. 1, Transitional Provisions and Savings) Order 1995 (S.I. 1995/2295)

== 2301–2400 ==
- Child Support Act 1995 (Commencement No. 1) Order 1995 (S.I. 1995/2302)
- Income-related Benefits Schemes and Social Security (Claims and Payments) (Miscellaneous Amendments) Regulations 1995 (S.I. 1995/2303)
- Residuary Body for Wales (Levies) Regulations 1995 (S.I. 1995/2306)
- National Health Service (Optical Charges and Payments) Amendment (No. 3) Regulations 1995 (S.I. 1995/2307)
- Legal Aid in Contempt of Court Proceedings (Scotland) Amendment Regulations 1995 (S.I. 1995/2319)
- Criminal Legal Aid (Scotland) Amendment Regulations 1995 (S.I. 1995/2320)
- Medicines Act 1968 (Amendment) Regulations 1995 (S.I. 1995/2321)
- Northern Birmingham Community Health National Health Service Trust (Transfer of Trust Property) Order 1995 (S.I. 1995/2322)
- Northern Birmingham Mental Health National Health Service Trust (Transfer of Trust Property) Order 1995 (S.I. 1995/2323)
- South Warwickshire Mental Health National Health Service Trust (Transfer of Trust Property) Order 1995 (S.I. 1995/2324)
- Fosse Health, Leicestershire Community National Health Service Trust (Transfer of Trust Property) Order 1995 (S.I. 1995/2325)
- Worcester Royal Infirmary National Health Service Trust (Transfer of Trust Property) Order 1995 (S.I. 1995/2326)
- City Hospital National Health Service Trust (Transfer of Trust Property) Order 1995 (S.I. 1995/2327)
- Motor Vehicles (EC Type Approval) (Amendment) Regulations 1995 (S.I. 1995/2328)
- Civil Aviation (Route Charges for Navigation Services) (Third Amendment) Regulations 1995 (S.I. 1995/2329)
- Customs Reviews and Appeals (Binding Tariff Information) Regulations 1995 (S.I. 1995/2351)
- National Health Service (Travelling Expenses and Remission of Charges) Amendment No. 2 Regulations 1995 (S.I. 1995/2352)
- Electricity Act 1989 (Disclosure of Information) (Director General of Electricity Supply for Northern Ireland) Order 1995 (S.I. 1995/2356)
- Construction Plant and Equipment (Harmonisation of Noise Emission Standards) (Amendment) Regulations 1995 (S.I. 1995/2357)
- Gaming Act (Variation of Monetary Limits) (Scotland) (No. 2) Order 1995 (S.I. 1995/2360)
- Rent Officers (Additional Functions) (Scotland) Amendment Order 1995 (S.I. 1995/2361)
- Offshore Installations (Safety Zones) (No. 5) Order 1995 (S.I. 1995/2363)
- Medicines (Products for Animal Use — Fees) Regulations 1995 (S.I. 1995/2364)
- Rent Officers (Additional Functions) (Amendment) Order 1995 (S.I. 1995/2365)
- Motor Cycle Noise Act 1987 (Commencement) Order 1995 (S.I. 1995/2367)
- Local Government Changes for England (School Reorganisation and Admissions) Regulations 1995 (S.I. 1995/2368)
- National Health Service (Optical Charges and Payments) (Scotland) Amendment (No.3) Regulations 1995 (S.I. 1995/2369)
- Motor Cycle Silencer and Exhaust Systems Regulations 1995 (S.I. 1995/2370)
- Magistrates' Courts Committees (Berkshire and Oxfordshire) Amalgamation Order 1995 (S.I. 1995/2372)
- Magistrates' Courts Committees (Bradford, Kirklees and Wakefield) Amalgamation Order 1995 (S.I. 1995/2373)
- Betting and Gaming Duties Act 1981 (Monetary Amounts) Order 1995 (S.I. 1995/2374)
- Magistrates' Courts Committees (Gwent, Mid Glamorgan and South Glamorgan) Amalgamation Order 1995 (S.I. 1995/2375)
- Magistrates' Courts Committees (Clwyd and Gwynedd) Amalgamation Order 1995 (S.I. 1995/2376)
- West Herts Community Health National Health Service Trust (Transfer of Trust Property) Order 1995 (S.I. 1995/2377)
- Mount Vernon and Watford Hospitals National Health Service Trust (Transfer of Trust Property) Order 1995 (S.I. 1995/2378)
- East Surrey Learning Disability and Mental Health Service National Health Service Trust (Change of Name) Order 1995 (S.I. 1995/2379)
- Shetland Islands Council (West Burrafirth) Harbour Revision Order 1995 (S.I. 1995/2380)
- National Health Service (Travelling Expenses and Remission of Charges) (Scotland) Amendment (No.2) Regulations 1995 (S.I. 1995/2381)
- Tay River Purification Board (Ordie Burn) Control Order 1995 (S.I. 1995/2382)
- Greater Manchester (Light Rapid Transit System) (Land Acquisition) Order 1995 (S.I. 1995/2383)
- Radioactive Substances (Hospitals) Exemption (Amendment) Order 1995 (S.I. 1995/2395)
- Veterinary Surgeons (Examination of Commonwealth and Foreign Candidates) (Amendment) Regulations Order of Council 1995 (S.I. 1995/2396)
- Veterinary Surgeons (Practice by Students) (Amendment) Regulations Order of Council 1995 (S.I. 1995/2397)

== 2401–2500 ==
- Rhondda Health Care National Health Service Trust (Transfer of Trust Property) Order 1995 (S.I. 1995/2411)
- Food Protection (Emergency Prohibitions) (Paralytic Shellfish Poisoning) (Nos.2, 3 and 4) Orders 1995 Partial Revocation Order 1995 (S.I. 1995/2425)
- Spring Traps Approval Order 1995 (S.I. 1995/2427)
- Animals and Animal Products (Import and Export) Regulations 1995 (S.I. 1995/2428)
- West Midlands Ambulance Service National Health Service Trust (Transfer of Trust Property) Order 1995 (S.I. 1995/2434)
- Mental Health Services of Salford National Health Service Trust (Transfer of Trust Property) Order 1995 (S.I. 1995/2435)
- Taxes (Interest Rate) (Amendment) Regulations 1995 (S.I. 1995/2436)
- Third Country Fishing (Enforcement) (Amendment) Order 1995 (S.I. 1995/2437)
- Motor Vehicles (Tests) (Amendment) (No. 2) Regulations 1995 (S.I. 1995/2438)
- Animals (Post-Import Control) Order 1995 (S.I. 1995/2439)
- A20 Trunk Road (Greenwich) Red Route Experimental Traffic Order 1995 (S.I. 1995/2443)
- A2 Trunk Road (Bexley) Red Route Experimental Traffic Order 1995 (S.I. 1995/2444)
- A20 Trunk Road (Bexley and Bromley) Red Route Experimental Traffic Order 1995 (S.I. 1995/2445)
- Trafford Park Railway Order 1995 (S.I. 1995/2446)
- Glanusk Park (Crickhowell)-Llyswen Trunk Road (A479) (Dderw Improvement) Order 1995 (S.I. 1995/2448)
- Local Government Act 1988 (Defined Activities) (Cleaning of Police Buildings) (Exemption) (England and Wales) Order 1995 (S.I. 1995/2449)
- Electricity Generating Stations (Gas Contracts) Order 1995 (S.I. 1995/2450)
- Local Government Changes (Rent Act) Regulations 1995 (S.I. 1995/2451)
- London South Circular Trunk Road (A205) (Catford Hill, Lewisham) (Prescribed Routes) Order 1995 (S.I. 1995/2454)
- Valuation Timetable (Scotland) Amendment Order 1995 (S.I. 1995/2455)
- Local Government (Assistants for Political Groups) (Remuneration) Order 1995 (S.I. 1995/2456)
- National Health Service Supplies Authority (Transfer of Trust Property) Order 1995 (S.I. 1995/2457)
- Chinnor and Princes Risborough Railway (Extension) Order 1995 (S.I. 1995/2458)
- National Blood Authority (Transfer of Trust Property) Order 1995 (S.I. 1995/2459)
- Olympic Symbol etc. (Protection) Act 1995 (Commencement) Order 1995 (S.I. 1995/2472)
- Olympics Association Right (Appointment of Proprietor) Order 1995 (S.I. 1995/2473)
- Airport Byelaws (Designation) Order 1995 (S.I. 1995/2474)
- Aerodromes (Designation) (Detention and Sale of Aircraft) Order 1995 (S.I. 1995/2475)
- Bovine Embryo (Collection, Production and Transfer) Regulations 1995 (S.I. 1995/2478)
- Bovine Embryo (Collection, Production and Transfer) (Fees) Regulations 1995 (S.I. 1995/2479)
- Education (School Information) (England) (Amendment) Regulations 1995 (S.I. 1995/2480)
- Food Protection (Emergency Prohibitions) (Paralytic Shellfish Poisoning) Order 1995 and (Nos.4 and 5) Orders 1995 Revocation Order 1995 (S.I. 1995/2481)
- Local Government Act 1988 (Defined Activities) (Specified Periods) (England) Regulations 1995 (S.I. 1995/2484)
- Medical Devices Fees Regulations 1995 (S.I. 1995/2487)
- Hallmarking (International Convention) (Amendment) Order 1995 (S.I. 1995/2488)
- Footwear (Indication of Composition) Labelling Regulations 1995 (S.I. 1995/2489)
- Local Government (Wales) Act 1994 (Commencement No. 5) Order 1995 (S.I. 1995/2490)
- Mid Glamorgan Ambulance National Health Service Trust (Transfer of Trust Property) Order 1995 (S.I. 1995/2491)
- Velindre Hospital National Health Service Trust (Transfer of Trust Property) Order 1995 (S.I. 1995/2492)
- Cardiff Community Healthcare National Health Service Trust (Transfer of Trust Property) Order 1995 (S.I. 1995/2493)
- University Dental Hospital National Health Service Trust (Transfer of Trust Property) Order 1995 (S.I. 1995/2494)
- Llandough Hospital and Community National Health Service Trust (Transfer of Trust Property) Order 1995 (S.I. 1995/2495)
- South and East Wales Ambulance National Health Service Trust (Transfer of Trust Property) (No.3) Order 1995 (S.I. 1995/2496)
- George Eliot Hospital National Health Service Trust (Transfer of Trust Property) Order 1995 (S.I. 1995/2497)
- Merchant Shipping (Reporting Requirements for Ships Carrying Dangerous or Polluting Goods) Regulations 1995 (S.I. 1995/2498)
- Local Authorities (Property Transfer) (Scotland) Order 1995 (S.I. 1995/2499)
- Local Government Property Commission (Scotland) Order 1995 (S.I. 1995/2500)

== 2501–2600 ==
- Low Moor Tramway Light Railway Order 1995 (S.I. 1995/2501)
- Motorways Traffic (Scotland) Regulations 1995 (S.I. 1995/2507)
- Police (Discipline) (Amendment No. 2) Regulations 1995 (S.I. 1995/2517)
- Value Added Tax Regulations 1995 (S.I. 1995/2518)
- A2 Trunk Road (Bexley) Red Route (Clearway) Traffic Order 1995 (S.I. 1995/2519)
- A2 Trunk Road (Greenwich) Red Route (Clearway) Traffic Order 1995 (S.I. 1995/2520)
- A10 Trunk Road (Enfield) Red Route (Clearway) Traffic Order 1995 (S.I. 1995/2521)
- A12 Trunk Road (Havering) Red Route (Clearway) Traffic Order 1995 (S.I. 1995/2522)
- A12 Trunk Road (Redbridge and Barking and Dagenham) Red Route (Clearway) Traffic Order 1995 (S.I. 1995/2523)
- A13 Trunk Road (Barking and Dagenham and Newham) Red Route (Clearway) Traffic Order 1995 (S.I. 1995/2524)
- A13 Trunk Road (Havering) Red Route (Clearway) Traffic Order 1995 (S.I. 1995/2525)
- A13 Trunk Road (Newham) Red Route (Clearway) Traffic Order 1995 (S.I. 1995/2526)
- A20 Trunk Road (Bexley and Bromley) Red Route (Clearway) Traffic Order 1995 (S.I. 1995/2527)
- A20 Trunk Road (Greenwich) Red Route (Clearway) Traffic Order 1995 (S.I. 1995/2528)
- A102 Trunk Road (Greenwich) Red Route (Clearway) Traffic Order 1995 (S.I. 1995/2529)
- A102 Trunk Road (Tower Hamlets) Red Route (Clearway) Traffic Order 1995 (S.I. 1995/2530)
- A127 Trunk Road (Havering) Red Route (Clearway) Traffic Order 1995 (S.I. 1995/2531)
- A406 Trunk Road (Enfield) Red Route (Clearway) Traffic Order 1995 (S.I. 1995/2532)
- A406 Trunk Road (Redbridge) Red Route (Clearway) Traffic Order 1995 (S.I. 1995/2533)
- A406 Trunk Road (Newham, Redbridge and Barking and Dagenham) Red Route (Clearway) Traffic Order 1995 (S.I. 1995/2534)
- A406 Trunk Road (Waltham Forest) Red Route (Clearway) Traffic Order 1995 (S.I. 1995/2535)
- A 1400 Trunk Road (Redbridge) Red Route (Clearway) Traffic Order 1995 (S.I. 1995/2536)
- Local Government Act 1988 (Defined Activities) (Competition) (Amendment) (England) Regulations 1995 (S.I. 1995/2546)
- Land Registration (Scotland) Act 1979 (Commencement No.9) Order 1995 (S.I. 1995/2547)
- Pensions Act 1995 (Commencement No. 1) Order 1995 (S.I. 1995/2548)
- Artificial Insemination of Cattle (Animal Health) (England and Wales) (Amendment) Regulations 1995 (S.I. 1995/2549)
- Video Recordings (Labelling) (Amendment) Regulations 1995 (S.I. 1995/2550)
- Video Recordings (Review of Determinations) Order 1995 (S.I. 1995/2551)
- Combined Probation Areas (Northumbria) Order 1995 (S.I. 1995/2552)
- Combined Probation Areas (North Wales) Order 1995 (S.I. 1995/2553)
- Combined Areas (West Yorkshire) Order 1995 (S.I. 1995/2554)
- Outer London Probation Areas (North East London) Order 1995 (S.I. 1995/2555)
- Artificial Insemination of Cattle (Animal Health) (Scotland) Amendment Regulations 1995 (S.I. 1995/2556)
- Social Security (Credits) Amendment Regulations 1995 (S.I. 1995/2558)
- Social Security (Effect of Family Credit on Earnings Factors) Regulations 1995 (S.I. 1995/2559)
- Local Authorities (Calculation of Council Tax Base) (Wales) Regulations 1995 (S.I. 1995/2561)
- Local Authorities (Precepts) (Wales) Regulations 1995 (S.I. 1995/2562)
- Local Government Reorganisation (Wales) (Transitional Provisions No. 4) Order 1995 (S.I. 1995/2563)
- Surrey Heartlands National Health Service Trust (Transfer of Trust Property) Order 1995 (S.I. 1995/2581)
- Collective Redundancies and Transfer of Undertakings (Protection of Employment) (Amendment) Regulations 1995 (S.I. 1995/2587)
- Wireless Telegraphy (Citizens' Band and Amateur Apparatus) (Various Provisions) (Amendment) Order 1995 (S.I. 1995/2588)
- Valuation Joint Boards (Scotland) Order 1995 (S.I. 1995/2589)
- Education (Teachers) (Amendment) (No. 2) Regulations 1995 (S.I. 1995/2594)

== 2601–2700 ==
- Social Security (Graduated Retirement Benefit) Amendment Regulations 1995 (S.I. 1995/2606)
- Measuring Instruments (EC Requirements) (Electrical Energy Meters) Regulations 1995 (S.I. 1995/2607)
- Crown Court (Amendment) Rules 1995 (S.I. 1995/2618)
- Magistrates' Courts (Amendment) (No. 2) Rules 1995 (S.I. 1995/2619)
- Social Fund Cold Weather Payments (General) Amendment Regulations 1995 (S.I. 1995/2620)
- Immigration (Transit Visa) (Amendment) Order 1995 (S.I. 1995/2621)
- Probation (Amendment) Rules 1995 (S.I. 1995/2622)
- Dearne Valley Enterprise Zones (Designation) Order 1995 (S.I. 1995/2624)
- East Midlands Enterprise Zones (North East Derbyshire) (Designation) Order 1995 (S.I. 1995/2625)
- Local Authorities (Goods and Services) (Public Bodies) (Meat Hygiene) Order 1995 (S.I. 1995/2626)
- County Court Fees (Amendment) Order 1995 (S.I. 1995/2627)
- Family Proceedings Fees (Amendment) Order 1995 (S.I. 1995/2628)
- Supreme Court Fees (Amendment) Order 1995 (S.I. 1995/2629)
- Mental Health Act Commission (Amendment) Regulations 1995 (S.I. 1995/2630)
- Amusement Machine Licence Duty Regulations 1995 (S.I. 1995/2631)
- North Eastern Combined Fire Services Area Administration Scheme Order 1995 (S.I. 1995/2632)
- Northern Combined Fire Services Area Administration Scheme Order 1995 (S.I. 1995/2633)
- South Eastern Combined Fire Services Area Administration Scheme Order 1995 (S.I. 1995/2634)
- Central Combined Fire Services Area Administration Scheme Order 1995 (S.I. 1995/2635)
- Mid and South Western Combined Fire Services Area Administration Scheme Order 1995 (S.I. 1995/2636)
- Mid Eastern Combined Fire Services Area Administration Scheme Order 1995 (S.I. 1995/2637)
- Central Scotland Combined Police Area Amalgamation Scheme Order 1995 (S.I. 1995/2638)
- Grampian Combined Police Area Amalgamation Scheme Order 1995 (S.I. 1995/2639)
- Lothian and Borders Combined Police Area Amalgamation Scheme Order 1995 (S.I. 1995/2640)
- Northern Combined Police Area Amalgamation Scheme Order 1995 (S.I. 1995/2641)
- Strathclyde Combined Police Area Amalgamation Scheme Order 1995 (S.I. 1995/2642)
- Tayside Combined Police Area Amalgamation Scheme Order 1995 (S.I. 1995/2643)
- Statutory Nuisance (Appeals) Regulations 1995 (S.I. 1995/2644)
- Blyth Harbour Act 1986 (Amendment) Order 1995 (S.I. 1995/2645)
- Health and Safety (Fees) Regulations 1995 (S.I. 1995/2646)
- Judicial Pensions (Guaranteed Minimum Pension etc.) Order 1995 (S.I. 1995/2647)
- Pensions Commutation (Amendment) Regulations 1995 (S.I. 1995/2648)
- Environment Act 1995 (Commencement No.2) Order 1995 (S.I. 1995/2649)
- Proceeds of Crime Act 1995 (Commencement) Order 1995 (S.I. 1995/2650)
- Marketing of Ornamental Plant Material Regulations 1995 (S.I. 1995/2651)
- Marketing of Vegetable Plant Material Regulations 1995 (S.I. 1995/2652)
- Marketing of Fruit Plant Material Regulations 1995 (S.I. 1995/2653)
- Protection of Wrecks (Designation No.1) Order 1995 (S.I. 1995/2654)
- Plant Variety Rights Office (Extension of Functions) Regulations 1995 (S.I. 1995/2655)
- River Nith Salmon Fishery District (Baits and Lures) Regulations 1995 (S.I. 1995/2682)
- River Arkaig, Loch Arkaig and Associated Waters Protection Order 1995 (S.I. 1995/2683)
- A10 Trunk Road (Enfield and Haringey) Red Route (Clearway) Traffic Order 1995 (S.I. 1995/2684)
- A23 Trunk Road (Croydon) Red Route (Bus Lanes) Experimental Traffic Order 1995 (S.I. 1995/2685)
- A23 Trunk Road (Croydon) Red Route (PrescribedRoute No.1) Experimental Traffic Order 1995 (S.I. 1995/2686)
- A23 Trunk Road (Croydon) Red RouteExperimental Traffic Order 1995 (S.I. 1995/2687)
- A205 Trunk Road (Richmond) Temporary Restriction of Traffic Order 1995 (S.I. 1995/2688)
- A23 Trunk Road (Croydon) Red Route (Clearway)Experimental Traffic Order 1995 (S.I. 1995/2689)
- Cheshire Community Healthcare National Health Service Trust (Transfer of Trust Property) Order 1995 (S.I. 1995/2691)
- Charities Act 1993 (Commencement and Transitional Provisions) Order 1995 (S.I. 1995/2695)
- Charities Act 1993 (Substitution of Sums) Order 1995 S.I. 1995/2696)
- Kent Ambulance National Health Service Trust (Establishment) Amendment Order 1995 (S.I. 1995/2697)
- West Cheshire National Health Service Trust (Transfer of Trust Property) Order 1995 (S.I. 1995/2698)
- Social Security (Canada) Order 1995 (S.I. 1995/2699)
- Air Navigation (Hong Kong) Order 1995 (S.I. 1995/2700)

== 2701–2800 ==
- Air Navigation (Overseas Territories) (Amendment) Order 1995 (S.I. 1995/2701)
- Child Support (Northern Ireland) Order 1995 (S.I. 1995/2702)
- European Convention on Extradition Order 1990 (Amendment) (No. 3) Order 1995 (S.I. 1995/2703)
- Health and Personal Social Services (Amendment) (Northern Ireland) Order 1995 (S.I. 1995/2704)
- Jobseekers (Northern Ireland) Order 1995 (S.I. 1995/2705)
- Double Taxation Relief (Taxes on Income) (Belarus) Order 1995 (S.I. 1995/2706)
- Double Taxation Relief (Taxes on Income) (Bolivia) Order 1995 (S.I. 1995/2707)
- Reciprocal Enforcement of Foreign Judgments (Canada) (Amendment) Order 1995 (S.I. 1995/2708)
- Reciprocal Enforcement of Maintenance Orders (United States of America) Order 1995 (S.I. 1995/2709)
- Civil Aviation (Canadian Navigation Services) (Second Amendment) Regulations 1995 (S.I. 1995/2713)
- Finance Act 1993, section 11, (Appointed Day) Order 1995 (S.I. 1995/2715)
- Other Fuel Substitutes (Rates of Excise Duty etc.) Order 1995 (S.I. 1995/2716)
- Other Fuel Substitutes (Payment of Excise Duty etc.) Regulations 1995 (S.I. 1995/2717)
- Housing (Welfare Services) (Wales) Order 1995 (S.I. 1995/2720)
- Companies Act 1989 Part II (Consequential Amendment) (No. 2) Regulations 1995 (S.I. 1995/2723)
- Charities (Accounts and Reports) Regulations 1995 (S.I. 1995/2724)
- Employment Code of Practice (Industrial Action Ballots and Notice to Employers) Order 1995 (S.I. 1995/2729)
- European Convention on Cinematographic Co-production (Amendment) (No. 3) Order 1995 (S.I. 1995/2730)
- National Health Service (Charges for Drugsand Appliances) Amendment (No. 2) Regulations 1995 (S.I. 1995/2737)
- East Midlands Enterprise Zones (Bassetlaw)(Designation) Order 1995 (S.I. 1995/2738)
- National Health Service (Charges for Drugs and Appliances) (Scotland) Amendment (No.2) Regulations 1995 (S.I. 1995/2739)
- Antarctic (Amendment) Regulations 1995 (S.I. 1995/2741)
- Environmental Protection (Determination of Enforcing Authority Etc.) (Scotland) Amendment Regulations 1995 (S.I. 1995/2742)
- A1 Trunk Road (Islington) Red Route Traffic Order 1993 Experimental Variation Order 1995 (S.I. 1995/2743)
- A205 Trunk Road (Richmond and Wandsworth) Red Route Experimental Traffic Order 1995 Amendment Order 1995. S.I. 1995/2744)
- A205 Trunk Road (Upper Richmond Road West) Red Route (Prescribed Route No.1) Experimental Traffic Order 1995 (S.I. 1995/2746)
- St. Paul's Road and Corsica Street (Islington) Temporary Prohibition of Traffic Order 1995 (S.I. 1995/2747)
- Antarctic Act 1994 (Commencement) Order 1995 (SI 1995/2748)
- Kidderminster Health Care National Health Service Trust (Transfer of Trust Property) Order 1995 (S.I. 1995/2749)
- Public Telecommunication System Designation (Orange Personal Communications Services Limited) Order 1995 (S.I. 1995/2750)
- East Midlands Enterprise Zones (Ashfield) (Designation) Order 1995 (S.I. 1995/2758)
- Environment Act 1995 (Commencement No. 3) Order 1995 (S.I. 1995/2765)
- Local Government (Application of Enactments) (Scotland) (No.2) Order 1995 (S.I. 1995/2766)
- Control of Dogs on Roads Orders (Procedure) (England and Wales) Regulations 1995 (S.I. 1995/2767)
- Police Federation (Amendment) Regulations 1995 (S.I. 1995/2768)
- Traffic Signs General (Amendment) Directions 1995 (S.I. 1995/2769)
- Hill Livestock (Compensatory Allowances) (Amendment) (No. 3) Regulations 1995 (S.I. 1995/2778)
- Sheep Annual Premium (Amendment) Regulations 1995 (S.I. 1995/2779)
- Arable Area Payments (Amendment) Regulations 1995 (S.I. 1995/2780)
- Trafford Healthcare National Health Service Trust (Transfer of Trust Property) (No. 2) Order 1995 (S.I. 1995/2781)
- Approval of Codes of Management Practice (Residential Property) Order 1995 (S.I. 1995/2782)
- National Health Service Trusts (Originating Capital Debt) (Wales) (No. 2) Order 1995 (S.I. 1995/2783)
- General Medical Council (Registration (Fees) (Amendment) Regulations) Order of Council 1995 (S.I. 1995/2786)
- Children (Scotland) Act 1995 (Commencement No.1) Order 1995 (S.I. 1995/2787)
- Acquisition of Land (Rate of Interest after Entry) (Scotland) Regulations 1995 (S.I. 1995/2791)
- Income-related Benefits Schemes Amendment (No. 2) Regulations 1995 (S.I. 1995/2792)
- Housing Benefit (Permitted Totals) and Council Tax Benefit (Permitted Total) (Pensions for War Widows) Amendment Order 1995 (S.I. 1995/2793)
- Local Government Act 1988 (Sports and Leisure Management, Cleaning of Buildings and Repair and Maintenance of Vehicles) (Exemption) Order 1995 (S.I. 1995/2794)
- Offshore Installations (Safety Zones) (No. 6) Order 1995 (S.I. 1995/2795)
- Local Government Changes For England (Property Transfer and Transitional Payments) (Amendment) Regulations 1995 (S.I. 1995/2796)
- Gwent Community Health National Health Service Trust (Establishment) Amendment Order 1995 (S.I. 1995/2797)
- Harrogate (Parishes) Order 1995 (S.I. 1995/2799)
- National Health Service Litigation Authority (Establishment and Constitution) Order 1995 (S.I. 1995/2800)

== 2801–2900 ==
- National Health Service Litigation Authority Regulations 1995 (S.I. 1995/2801)
- Magistrates' Courts (Reciprocal Enforcement of Maintenance Orders) (United States of America) Rules 1995 (S.I. 1995/2802)
- National Park Authorities (Wales) Order 1995 (S.I. 1995/2803)
- Medicines (Exemption from Licences) (Clinical Trials) Order 1995 (S.I. 1995/2808)
- Medicines (Exemption from Licences and Certificates) (Clinical Trials) Order 1995 (S.I. 1995/2809)
- Morriston Hospital National Health Service Trust (Transfer of Trust Property) (No. 2) Order 1995 (S.I. 1995/2811)
- East Durham Enterprise Zones(Designation) Order 1995 (S.I. 1995/2812)
- Local Government Act 1988 (Competition) (Information Technology) (England) Regulations 1995 (S.I. 1995/2813)
- Teachers' Superannuation (Additional Voluntary Contributions) (Scotland) Regulations 1995 (S.I. 1995/2814)
- Lottery Duty (Instant Chances) Regulations 1995 (S.I. 1995/2815)
- Boundary Bridges (Wales) (Appointed Day) Order 1995 (S.I. 1995/2816)
- Housing (Change of Landlord) (Payment of Disposal Cost by Instalments) (Amendment No. 2) Regulations 1995 (S.I. 1995/2823)
- Wildlife and Countryside Act 1981 (Amendment) Regulations 1995 (S.I. 1995/2825)
- Deregulation and Contracting Out Act 1994 (Commencement No. 4 and Transitional Provisions) Order 1995 (S.I. 1995/2835)
- Meat (Hygiene, Inspection and Examinations for Residues) (Charges) (Amendment) Regulations 1995 (S.I. 1995/2836)
- Local Government Reorganisation (Compensation for Loss of Remuneration) Regulations 1995 (S.I. 1995/2837)
- County Court (Amendment No. 3) Rules 1995 (S.I. 1995/2838)
- County Court (Forms) (Amendment No. 3) Rules 1995 (S.I. 1995/2839)
- Curfew Order (Responsible Officer) (Berkshire, Greater Manchester and Norfolk) Order 1995 (S.I. 1995/2840)
- Export Refunds (Administrative Penalties) (Rate of Interest) Regulations 1995 (S.I. 1995/2861)
- Local Government Changes for England (Finance) (Amendment) Regulations 1995 (S.I. 1995/2862)
- Town and Country Planning (Minerals) Regulations 1995 (S.I. 1995/2863)
- Police Areas (Wales) Order 1995 (S.I. 1995/2864)
- Local Government (Compensation for Reduction of Remuneration on Reorganisation) (Scotland) Regulations 1995 (S.I. 1995/2865)
- Local Government etc. (Scotland) Act 1994 (Commencement No.5) Order 1995 (S.I. 1995/2866)
- Parliamentary Pensions (Amendment) Regulations 1995 (S.I. 1995/2867)
- Housing Benefit (General) Amendment (No.2) Regulations 1995 (S.I. 1995/2868)
- Goods Vehicles (Licensing of Operators) Regulations 1995 (S.I. 1995/2869)
- Escape and Rescue from Mines Regulations 1995 (S.I. 1995/2870)
- Habitat (Salt-Marsh) (Amendment) Regulations 1995 (S.I. 1995/2871)
- Seed Potatoes originating in the Netherlands (Notification) (Scotland) Order 1995 (S.I. 1995/2874)
- Christie Hospital National Health Service Trust (Transfer of Trust Property) Order 1995 (S.I. 1995/2875)
- Gibraltar Point (Area of Special Protection) Order 1995 (S.I. 1995/2876)
- Tribunals And Inquiries (Antarctic Act Tribunal) Order 1995 (S.I. 1995/2877)
- Diligence against Earnings (Variation) (Scotland) Regulations 1995 (S.I. 1995/2878)
- Trunk Road (A3) (Robin Hood Way Service Road, Kingston upon Thames) (Restriction of Entry) Order 1982 (Variation) Order 1995 (S.I. 1995/2879)
- Sale of Registration Marks Regulations 1995 (S.I. 1995/2880)
- Local Government Changes for England (Collection Fund Surpluses and Deficits) Regulations 1995 (S.I. 1995/2889)
- Habitat (Salt-Marsh) (Correction to Amendment) Regulations 1995 (S.I. 1995/2891)
- Finance Act 1995, section 20, (Appointed Day) Order 1995 (S.I. 1995/2892)
- Revenue Traders (Accounts and Records) (Amendment) Regulations 1995 (S.I. 1995/2893)
- Local Government Changes For England (Designation of Authorities) Order 1995 (S.I. 1995/2894)
- Local Government Changes for England (Payments to Designated Authorities) (Minimum Revenue Provision) Regulations 1995 (S.I. 1995/2895)
- Sporting Grounds and Sporting Events (Designation) (Scotland) Amendment Order 1995 (S.I. 1995/2896)
- Rules of the Supreme Court (Amendment No.2) 1995 (S.I. 1995/2897)
- Bristol Development Corporation (Planning Functions) Order 1995 (S.I. 1995/2899)
- Bristol Development Corporation (Transfer of Property, Rights and Liabilities) Order 1995 (S.I. 1995/2900)

== 2901–3000 ==
- Local Government Act 1988 (Defined Activities) (Exemption) (Fire Services) (England and Wales) Order 1995 (S.I. 1995/2901)
- Taxation of Income from Land (Non-residents) Regulations 1995 (S.I. 1995/2902)
- Insurance Brokers (Registration) Act 1977 (Amendment) Order 1995 (S.I. 1995/2906)
- Child Support Commissioners (Procedure) (Amendment) Regulations 1995 (S.I. 1995/2907)
- Public Service Vehicles (Operators' Licences) Regulations 1995 (S.I. 1995/2908)
- Public Service Vehicles (Operators' Licences) (Fees) Regulations 1995 (S.I. 1995/2909)
- Local Authorities (Funds) (England) (Amendment) Regulations 1995 (S.I. 1995/2910)
- Products of Animal Origin (Import and Export) (Amendment) Regulations 1995 (S.I. 1995/2911)
- Registered Designs Rules 1995 (S.I. 1995/2912)
- Registered Designs (Fees) (No. 2) Rules 1995 (S.I. 1995/2913)
- Consumer Credit (Exempt Agreements) (Amendment) (No. 2) Order 1995 (S.I. 1995/2914)
- Local Government Act 1988 (Defined Activities) (Exemption) (Stockton-on-Tees Borough Council) Order 1995 (S.I. 1995/2915)
- Local Government Act 1988 (Competition) (Financial Services) (England) Regulations 1995 (S.I. 1995/2916)
- Foreign Satellite Service Proscription Order 1995 (S.I. 1995/2917)
- Animal Health Orders (Divisional Veterinary Manager Amendment) Order 1995 (S.I. 1995/2922)
- Health and Safety Information for Employees (Modifications and Repeals) Regulations 1995 (S.I. 1995/2923)
- Social Security (Income Support, Claims and Payments and Adjudication) Amendment Regulations 1995 (S.I. 1995/2927)
- Immigration (Registration with Police) (Amendment) Regulations 1995 (S.I. 1995/2928)
- Plant Health (Great Britain) (Amendment) (No.2) Order 1995 (S.I. 1995/2929)
- Road Traffic (Special Parking Area) (London Borough of Croydon) (Amendment) Order 1995 (S.I. 1995/2930)
- Income and Corporation Taxes Act 1988, section 51A, (Appointed Day) Order 1995 (S.I. 1995/2932)
- Finance Act 1995, section 82, (Appointed Day) Order 1995 (S.I. 1995/2933)
- Income Tax (Gilt-edged Securities) (Gross Payments of Interest) Regulations 1995 (S.I. 1995/2934)
- Social Security (Invalid Care Allowance) Amendment Regulations 1995 (S.I. 1995/2935)
- Civil Aviation (Aerial Advertising) Regulations 1995 (S.I. 1995/2943)
- Sole, Plaice, Cod and Haddock (Specified Sea Areas) (Prohibition of Fishing) Order 1995 (S.I. 1995/2944)
- Northern Ireland (Remission of Sentences) Act 1995 (Commencement) Order 1995 (S.I. 1995/2945)
- Statistics of Trade (Customs and Excise) (Amendment) Regulations 1995 (S.I. 1995/2946)
- Plant Breeders' Rights (Fees) (Amendment) (No. 2) Regulations 1995 (S.I. 1995/2947)
- Environment Act 1995 (Commencement No. 4 and Saving Provisions) Order 1995 (S.I. 1995/2950)
- Combined Probation Areas (Hertfordshire) Order 1995 (S.I. 1995/2951)
- Forge Lane, Horbury Level Crossing Order 1995 (S.I. 1995/2952)
- Local Government Pension Scheme (Augmentation) Regulations 1995 (S.I. 1995/2953)
- County Council of Staffordshire (Trent and Mersey Canal) Bridge Scheme 1994 Confirmation Instrument 1995 (S.I. 1995/2956)
- Stockport Healthcare National Health Service Trust (Transfer of Trust Property) Order 1995 (S.I. 1995/2958)
- Stockport Acute Services National Health Service Trust (Transfer of Trust Property) Order 1995 (S.I. 1995/2959)
- Colleges of Further Education (Changes of Name) (Scotland) Order 1995 (S.I. 1995/2960)
- Judicial Pensions (Contributions) (Amendment) Regulations 1995 (S.I. 1995/2961)
- Land Registration (District Registries) Order 1995 (S.I. 1995/2962)
- Landlord and Tenant (Covenants) Act 1995 (Commencement) Order 1995 (S.I. 1995/2963)
- Landlord and Tenant (Covenants) Act 1995 (Notices) Regulations 1995 (S.I. 1995/2964)
- A30 Trunk Road (Great South West Road, Hounslow) (Temporary Restriction of Traffic) Order 1995 (S.I. 1995/2965)
- A41 Trunk Road (Baker Street) (Temporary Restriction of Traffic) Order 1995 (S.I. 1995/2966)
- A501 Trunk Road (Fitzroy Street) (Temporary Restriction of Traffic) Order 1995 (S.I. 1995/2967)
- A501 Trunk Road (Marylebone Road/Osnaburgh Street) (Temporary Restriction of Traffic) Order 1995 (S.I. 1995/2968)
- A501 Trunk Road (North Gower Street) (Temporary Restriction of Traffic) Order 1995 (S.I. 1995/2969)
- Western Isles Islands Council (Leverburgh) Harbour Revision Order 1995 (S.I. 1995/2971)
- European Communities (Designation) (No. 3) Order 1995 (S.I. 1995/2983)
- Ministerial and other Salaries Order 1995 (S.I. 1995/2984)
- Transfer of Functions (Science) Order 1995 (S.I. 1995/2985)
- Transfer of Functions (Education and Employment) Order 1995 (S.I. 1995/2986)
- Copyright (Application to Other Countries) (Amendment) Order 1995 (S.I. 1995/2987)
- Designs (Convention Countries) (Amendment) Order 1995 (S.I. 1995/2988)
- Patents (Convention Countries) (Amendment) Order 1995 (S.I. 1995/2989)
- Performances (Reciprocal Protection) (Convention Countries) Order 1995 (S.I. 1995/2990)
- Financial Provisions (Northern Ireland) Order 1995 (S.I. 1995/2991)
- Parliamentary Constituencies (Northern Ireland) Order 1995 (S.I. 1995/2992)
- Police (Amendment) (Northern Ireland) Order 1995 (S.I. 1995/2993)
- Road Traffic (Northern Ireland) Order 1995 (S.I. 1995/2994)
- Transfer of Functions (European Parliamentary Pay and Pensions) Order 1995 (S.I. 1995/2995)
- Local Government Act 1988 (Defined Activities, Exemptions) (Wales) (Amendment) Order 1995 (S.I. 1995/2996)
- Trade Marks (Claims to Priority from Relevant Countries) (Amendment) Order 1995 (S.I. 1995/2997)
- Exempt Charities Order 1995 (S.I. 1995/2998)
- Goods Vehicles (Licensing of Operators) (Fees) Regulations 1995 (S.I. 1995/3000)

== 3001–3100 ==
- Police (Scotland) Amendment (No.4) Regulations 1995 (S.I. 1995/3001)
- Designation of Structure Plan Areas (Scotland) Order 1995 (S.I. 1995/3002)
- Police and Magistrates' Courts Act 1994 (Commencement No.9 and Amendment) Order 1995 (S.I. 1995/3003)
- Potatoes Originating in the Netherlands Order 1995 (S.I. 1995/3018)
- National Park Authorities (Levies) (Wales) Regulations 1995 (S.I. 1995/3019)
- Occupational Pensions (Revaluation) Order 1995 (S.I. 1995/3021)
- Company and Business Names (Amendment) Regulations 1995 (S.I. 1995/3022)
- Dundee Port Authority Transfer Scheme 1995 Confirmation Order 1995 (S.I. 1995/3023)
- Soft Fruit Plants (Scotland) Revocation Order 1995 (S.I. 1995/3024)
- Police Grant (Scotland) Amendment Order 1995 (S.I. 1995/3025)
- Strathclyde Passenger Transport Authority (Constitution, Membership and Transitional and Consequential Provisions) Order 1995 (S.I. 1995/3026)
- National Blood Authority (Transfer of Trust Property) (No. 2) Order 1995 (S.I. 1995/3028)
- Medicines (Pharmacies) (Applications for Registration and Fees) Amendment Regulations 1995 (S.I. 1995/3029)
- Income Tax (Indexation) Order 1995 (S.I. 1995/3031)
- Inheritance Tax (Indexation) Order 1995 (S.I. 1995/3032)
- Capital Gains Tax (Annual Exempt Amount) Order 1995 (S.I. 1995/3033)
- Retirement Benefits Schemes (Indexation of Earnings Cap) Order 1995 (S.I. 1995/3034)
- Income Tax (Cash Equivalents of Car Fuel Benefits) Order 1995 (S.I. 1995/3035)
- Manufactured Payments and Transfer of Securities (Tax Relief) Regulations 1995 (S.I. 1995/3036)
- Value Added Tax (Increase of Registration Limits) Order 1995 (S.I. 1995/3037)
- Value Added Tax (Place of Supply of Services) (Amendment) Order 1995 (S.I. 1995/3038)
- Value Added Tax (Ships and Aircraft) Order 1995 (S.I. 1995/3039)
- Value Added Tax (Increase of Consideration for Fuel) Order 1995 (S.I. 1995/3040)
- Value Added Tax (Tax Free Shops) Order 1995 (S.I. 1995/3041)
- Value Added Tax (Treatment of Transactions) (Trading Stamps) Order 1995 (S.I. 1995/3042)
- Value Added Tax (Trading Stamps) Regulations 1995 (S.I. 1995/3043)
- Travellers' Allowances Amendment Order 1995 (S.I. 1995/3044)
- Annual Close Time (River Eachaig Salmon Fishery District) Order 1995 (S.I. 1995/3047)
- Town and Country Planning (Limit of Annual Value) (Scotland) Order 1995 (S.I. 1995/3048)
- Road Vehicles (Construction and Use) (Amendment) (No. 6) Regulations 1995 (S.I. 1995/3051)
- Motor Vehicles (Authorisation of Special Types) (Amendment) Order 1995 (S.I. 1995/3052)
- National Assistance (Assessment of Resources) (Amendment No. 2) Regulations 1995 (S.I. 1995/3054)
- Social Security (Claims and Payments) Amendment Regulations 1995 (S.I. 1995/3055)
- Valuation Tribunals (Wales) Regulations 1995 (S.I. 1995/3056)
- Kensington and Chelsea and Hammersmith and Fulham (London Borough Boundaries) Order 1995 (S.I. 1995/3057)
- A102 Trunk Road (Blackwall Tunnel Approach, Greenwich) (Tunnel Avenue Slip Road) Order 1995 (S.I. 1995/3058)
- Beer (Amendment) Regulations 1995 (S.I. 1995/3059)
- Export of Goods (Control) (Amendment) Order 1995 (S.I. 1995/3060)
- Criminal Appeal Act 1995 (Commencement No. 1 and Transitional Provisions) Order 1995 (S.I. 1995/3061)
- Friendly Societies (Activities of a Subsidiary) Order 1995 (S.I. 1995/3062)
- Building Societies (Designation of Qualifying Bodies) (No. 2) Order 1995 (S.I. 1995/3063)
- Building Societies (Liquid Asset) (Amendment) (No. 2) Regulations 1995 (S.I. 1995/3064)
- Building Societies (Accounts and Related Provisions) (Amendment) Regulations 1995 (S.I. 1995/3065)
- Building Societies (Syndicated Lending) Order 1995 (S.I. 1995/3066)
- Occupational and Personal Pension Schemes (Miscellaneous Amendments) (No. 2) Regulations 1995 (S.I. 1995/3067)
- New Town (East Kilbride) (Transfer of Property, Rights and Liabilities) Order 1995 (S.I. 1995/3068)
- Act of Sederunt (Lands Valuation Appeal Court) 1995 (S.I. 1995/3069)
- Motorways Traffic (Scotland) Amendment Regulations 1995 (S.I. 1995/3070)
- National Health Service (Amendment) Act 1995 (Commencement No. 1 and Saving) Order 1995 (S.I. 1995/3090)
- National Health Service (Service Committees and Tribunal) Amendment Regulations 1995 (S.I. 1995/3091)
- National Health Service (General Dental Services) Amendment Regulations 1995 (S.I. 1995/3092)
- National Health Service (General Medical Services) Amendment (No. 2) Regulations 1995 (S.I. 1995/3093)
- Act of Sederunt (Fees of Messengers-at-Arms) 1995 (S.I. 1995/3094)
- Act of Sederunt (Fees of Sheriff Officers) 1995 (S.I. 1995/3095)
- Environmentally Sensitive Areas (Breadalbane) Designation (Amendment) Order 1995 (S.I. 1995/3096)
- Environmentally Sensitive Areas (Loch Lomond) Designation (Amendment) Order 1995 (S.I. 1995/3097)
- London Docklands Development Corporation (Alteration of Boundaries) Order 1995 (S.I. 1995/3098)
- Financial Assistance for Environmental Purposes (No. 4) Order 1995 (S.I. 1995/3099)
- A12 TRUNK ROAD (COLCHESTER ROAD, HAVERING) (PRESCRIBED ROUTES) ORDER 1995 (S.I. 1995/3100)

== 3101–3200 ==
- Retirement Benefits Schemes (Information Powers) Regulations 1995 (S.I. 1995/3103)
- Pensions Act 1995 (Commencement No. 2) Order 1995 (S.I. 1995/3104)
- Local Government (Changes for the Registration Service in Avon, Cleveland, Humberside and North Yorkshire) Order 1995 (S.I. 1995/3105)
- Local Government (Registration Service in Wales) Order 1995 (S.I. 1995/3106)
- Traffic Signs (Amendment) Regulations and General Directions 1995 (S.I. 1995/3107)
- Local Government Act 1988 (Defined Activities) (Competition) (Supervision of Parking) (Amendment) (England) Regulations 1995 (S.I. 1995/3108)
- Mallaig Harbour Revision Order 1995 (S.I. 1995/3109)
- Special Educational Needs Tribunal Regulations 1995 (S.I. 1995/3113)
- Local Government Changes for England (Local Management of Schools) Regulations 1995 (S.I. 1995/3114)
- Spreadable Fats (Marketing Standards) Regulations 1995 (S.I. 1995/3116)
- Measuring Equipment (Liquid Fuel Delivered from Road Tankers) (Amendment) Regulations 1995 (S.I. 1995/3117)
- Local Government Act 1988 (Defined Activities) (Specified Periods) (England) (Amendment) Regulations 1995 (S.I. 1995/3118)
- War Pensions Committees (Amendment) Regulations 1995 (S.I. 1995/3119)
- Haddock (Specified Sea Areas) (Prohibition of Fishing) Order 1995 (S.I. 1995/3122)
- Sweeteners in Food Regulations 1995 (S.I. 1995/3123)
- Colours in Food Regulations 1995 (S.I. 1995/3124)
- Finance Act 1994, section 105, (Appointed Day) Order 1995 (S.I. 1995/3125)
- County Council of Clwyd (River Dee Estuary Bridge) (Variation) Scheme 1995 Confirmation Instrument 1995 (S.I. 1995/3126)
- Avon Fire Services (Combination Scheme) Order 1995 (S.I. 1995/3127)
- Merchant Shipping (Port State Control) Regulations 1995 (S.I. 1995/3128)
- Restrictive Trade Practices (Standards and Arrangements) (Goods) Order 1995 (S.I. 1995/3129)
- Restrictive Trade Practices (Standards and Arrangements) (Services) Order 1995 (S.I. 1995/3130)
- Cleveland Fire Services (Combination Scheme) Order 1995 (S.I. 1995/3131)
- Humberside Fire Services (Combination Scheme) Order 1995 (S.I. 1995/3132)
- North Yorkshire Fire Services (Combination Scheme) Order 1995 (S.I. 1995/3133)
- Insurance Companies (Pension Business) (Transitional Provisions) (Amendment) Regulations 1995 (S.I. 1995/3134)
- A4 Trunk Road (Hillingdon and Hounslow) Red Route Experimental Traffic Order 1995 (S.I. 1995/3138)
- A40 Trunk Road (Ealing) Red Route (Clearway) Traffic Order 1995 (S.I. 1995/3139)
- A40 Trunk Road (Ealing) Red Route Traffic Order 1995 (S.I. 1995/3140)
- A406 Trunk Road (Ealing) Red Route (Clearway) Traffic Order 1995 (S.I. 1995/3141)
- A406 Trunk Road (Brent) Red Route (Clearway) Traffic Order 1995 (S.I. 1995/3142)
- A406 Trunk Road (Brent) Red Route Experimental Traffic Order 1995 (S.I. 1995/3143)
- A406 Trunk Road (Brent) Red Route (Prescribed Route) Experimental Traffic Order 1995 (S.I. 1995/3144)
- Criminal Justice Act 1988 (Confiscation Orders) Order 1995 (S.I. 1995/3145)
- Air Quality Standards (Amendment) Regulations 1995 (S.I. 1995/3146)
- Value Added Tax (Amendment) Regulations 1995 (S.I. 1995/3147)
- Rent Officers (Additional Functions) (Amendment No. 2) Order 1995 (S.I. 1995/3148)
- Approval of Codes of Management Practice (Residential Property) (No. 2) Order 1995 (S.I. 1995/3149)
- Local Government Reorganisation (Wales) (Finance) (Miscellaneous Amendments and Transitional Provisions) Order 1995 (S.I. 1995/3150)
- Housing Benefit (Permitted Totals) Amendment Order 1995 (S.I. 1995/3151)
- Social Security (Unemployment, Sickness and Invalidity Benefit) Amendment (No. 2) Regulations 1995 (S.I. 1995/3152)
- Land Registration (No. 3) Rules 1995 (S.I. 1995/3153)
- Land Registration (Overriding Leases) Rules 1995 (S.I. 1995/3154)
- Water Byelaws (Loch an Sgoltaire) Extension Order 1995 (S.I. 1995/3155)
- Marriage (Prescription of Forms) (Scotland) Amendment Regulations 1995 (S.I. 1995/3156)
- Registration of Births, Still-births, Deaths and Marriages (Prescription of Forms) (Scotland) Amendment Regulations 1995 (S.I. 1995/3157)
- Adopted Children Register and Parental Order Register (Form of Entry) (Scotland) Regulations 1995 (S.I. 1995/3158)
- Hounslow (Various Roads) Traffic Order 1969 (Variation) Order 1995 (S.I. 1995/3159)
- Civil Aviation (Route Charges for Navigation Services) Regulations 1995 (S.I. 1995/3160)
- Civil Aviation (Joint Financing) (Amendment) Regulations 1995 (S.I. 1995/3161)
- Registration of Births, Deaths and Marriages (Fees) Order 1995 (S.I. 1995/3162)
- Reporting of Injuries, Diseases and Dangerous Occurrences Regulations 1995 (S.I. 1995/3163)
- A40 Trunk Road (Hillingdon) Red Route (Clearway) Traffic Order 1995 (S.I. 1995/3164)
- A41 Trunk Road (Watford Way/Hendon Way, Barnet) Temporary Prohibition of Traffic Order 1995 (S.I. 1995/3165)
- A41 Trunk Road (Baker Street) Red Route (Prohibited Turn) (No. 1) Experimental Traffic Order 1995 (S.I. 1995/3166)
- A41 Trunk Road (Westminster) Red Route (Bus Lane) Experimental Traffic Order 1995 (S.I. 1995/3167)
- A501 Trunk Road (Euston Road and Osnaburgh Street, Camden and Westminster) Red Route (Prescribed Route and Prohibited Turn No. 1) Experimental Traffic Order 1995 (S.I. 1995/3168)
- Civil Courts (Amendment) (No. 2) Order 1995 (S.I. 1995/3173)
- Medicines (Products Other Than Veterinary Drugs) (Prescription Only) Amendment (No. 2) Order 1995 (S.I. 1995/3174)
- Community Trade Mark (Fees) Regulations 1995 (S.I. 1995/3175)
- Fire Services (Notification of Establishment Schemes) (Scotland) Regulations 1995 (S.I. 1995/3176)
- Non-Domestic Rating Contributions (Scotland) Amendment Regulations 1995 (S.I. 1995/3177)
- Electromagnetic Compatibility (Amendment) Regulations 1995 (S.I. 1995/3180)
- Non-Domestic Rating Contributions (England) (Amendment) Regulations 1995 (S.I. 1995/3181)
- Sussex Ambulance Service National Health Service Trust (Transfer of Trust Property) Order 1995 (S.I. 1995/3182)
- Occupational Pension Schemes (Equal Treatment) Regulations 1995 (S.I. 1995/3183)
- Revenue Support Grant (Specified Bodies) (Amendment) Regulations 1995 (S.I. 1995/3184)
- Rent Officers (Additional Functions) (Scotland) Amendment (No.2) Order 1995 (S.I. 1995/3185)
- Agricultural Wages Committees (Areas) (England) Order 1995 (S.I. 1995/3186)
- Miscellaneous Food Additives Regulations 1995 (S.I. 1995/3187)
- Railtrack (Swinedyke Level Crossing) Order 1995 (S.I. 1995/3188)
- Fresh Meat (Hygiene and Inspection) (Amendment) Regulations 1995 (S.I. 1995/3189)
- Retirement Age of General Commissioners Order 1995 (S.I. 1995/3192)
- Medicines (Veterinary Drugs) (Pharmacy and Merchants' List) (Amendment) Order 1995 (S.I. 1995/3193)
- Local Government (Wales) Act 1994 (Commencement No. 6) Order 1995 (S.I. 1995/3198)
- National Health Service (General Medical Services) (Scotland) Amendment Regulations 1995 (S.I. 1995/3199)
- National Health Service (General Dental Services) (Scotland) Amendment Regulations 1995 (S.I. 1995/3200)

== 3201–3300 ==
- National Health Service (Service Committees and Tribunal) (Scotland) Amendment Regulations 1995 (S.I. 1995/3201)
- Bread and Flour Regulations 1995 (S.I. 1995/3202)
- City of Sunderland College (Incorporation) Order 1995 (S.I. 1995/3203)
- City of Sunderland College (Government) Regulations 1995 (S.I. 1995/3204)
- Minced Meat and Meat Preparations (Hygiene) Regulations 1995 (S.I. 1995/3205)
- European Communities (Designation) (No. 4) Order 1995 (S.I. 1995/3207)
- European Specialist Medical Qualifications Order 1995 (S.I. 1995/3208)
- Extradition (Torture) (Bermuda) Order 1995 (S.I. 1995/3209)
- Street Works (Northern Ireland) Order 1995 (S.I. 1995/3210)
- Polygamous Marriages (Northern Ireland) Order 1995 (S.I. 1995/3211)
- Agriculture (Conservation Grants) (Northern Ireland) Order 1995 (S.I. 1995/3212)
- Pensions (Northern Ireland) Order 1995 (S.I. 1995/3213)
- National Health Service (Amendment) Act 1995 (Commencement No.2 and Saving) (Scotland) Order 1995 (S.I. 1995/3214)
- Medicines (Sale or Supply) (Miscellaneous Provisions) Amendment Regulations 1995 (S.I. 1995/3215)
- Medicines (Products Other Than Veterinary Drugs) (General Sale List) Amendment Order 1995 (S.I. 1995/3216)
- Police and Criminal Evidence Act 1984 (Application to Customs and Excise) (Amendment ) Order 1995 (S.I. 1995/3217)
- North Wales Fire Services (Combination Scheme) Order 1995 (S.I. 1995/3218)
- Income Tax (Stock Lending) (Amendment No. 2) Regulations 1995 (S.I. 1995/3219)
- Sale and Repurchase of Securities (Modification of Enactments) Regulations 1995 (S.I. 1995/3220)
- Income Tax (Manufactured Interest) (Amendment) Regulations 1995 (S.I. 1995/3221)
- Value Added Tax (Imported Goods) Relief (Amendment) Order 1995 (S.I. 1995/3222)
- Deregulation (Building Societies) Order 1995 (S.I. 1995/3223)
- Gilt-edged Securities (PeriodicAccounting for Tax on Interest) Regulations 1995 (S.I. 1995/3224)
- Lloyd's Underwriters (Gilt-edged Securities) (Periodic Accounting for Tax on Interest) Regulations 1995 (S.I. 1995/3225)
- Jobseekers Act 1995 (Commencement No. 1) Order 1995 (S.I. 1995/3228)
- Mid and West Wales Fire Services (Combination Scheme) Order 1995 (S.I. 1995/3229)
- South Wales Fire Services (Combination Scheme) Order 1995 (S.I. 1995/3230)
- Deregulation (Greyhound Racing) Order 1995 (S.I. 1995/3231)
- Dog Racecourse Totalisator Regulations 1995 (S.I. 1995/3232)
- Deregulation (Building Societies) Order 1995 (S.I. 1995/3233)
- Health and Safety (Repeals and Revocations) Regulations 1995 (S.I. 1995/3234)
- Non-Domestic Rating Contributions (Wales) (Amendment) Regulations 1995 (S.I. 1995/3235)
- Finance Act 1995, section 63 (2), (Appointed Day) Order 1995 (S.I. 1995/3236)
- Insurance Companies (Overseas Life Assurance Business) (Compliance) Regulations 1995 (S.I. 1995/3237)
- Insurance Companies (Overseas Life Assurance Business) (Tax Credit) Regulations 1995 (S.I. 1995/3238)
- Tax-exempt Special Savings Account (Relevant European Institutions) Regulations 1995 (S.I. 1995/3239)
- Cheese and Cream Regulations 1995 (S.I. 1995/3240)
- Cycle Racing on Highways (Amendment) Regulations 1995 (S.I. 1995/3241)
- Church Representation Rules (Amendment) Resolution 1995 (S.I. 1995/3243)
- Misuse of Drugs (Amendment) (No. 2) Regulations 1995 (S.I. 1995/3244)
- Saithe (Specified Sea Areas) (Prohibition of Fishing) Order 1995 (S.I. 1995/3245)
- Specified Bovine Offal (Amendment) Order 1995 (S.I. 1995/3246)
- Environmental Protection (Prescribed Processes and Substances) (Amendment) Regulations 1995 (S.I. 1995/3247)
- Insurance Companies (Amendment) Regulations 1995 (S.I. 1995/3248)
- Export of Goods (Control) (Amendment No. 2) Order 1995 (S.I. 1995/3249)
- Water Undertakings (Rateable Values) (Scotland) (No.2) Order 1995 (S.I. 1995/3252)
- Docks and Harbours (Rateable Values) (Scotland) Amendment (No.2) Order 1995 (S.I. 1995/3253)
- Severn Bridges Tolls Order 1995 (S.I. 1995/3254)
- Hinchingbrooke Health Care National Health Service Trust (Transfer of Trust Property) Order 1995 (S.I. 1995/3256)
- Kent and Sussex Weald National Health Service Trust (Transfer of Trust Property) Order 1995 (S.I. 1995/3257)
- Mid Kent Healthcare National Health Service Trust (Transfer of Trust Property) Order 1995 (S.I. 1995/3258)
- Weald of Kent Community National Health Service Trust (Transfer of Trust Property) Order 1995 (S.I. 1995/3259)
- Queen Victoria Hospital National Health Service Trust (Transfer of Trust Property) Order 1995 (S.I. 1995/3260)
- Child Support (Miscellaneous Amendments) (No. 2) Regulations 1995 (S.I. 1995/3261)
- Child Support Act 1995 (Commencement No. 2) Order 1995 (S.I. 1995/3262)
- Child Support (Compensation for Recipients of Family Credit and Disability Working Allowance) Regulations 1995 (S.I. 1995/3263)
- Local Government Changes (Rent Act Registration Areas) Order 1995 (S.I. 1995/3264)
- Child Support (Miscellaneous Amendments) (No. 3) Regulations 1995 (S.I. 1995/3265)
- City of Manchester (Mancunian Way A635(M) and A57(M) Mancunian Way Slip Roads) Special Road Scheme 1992 Confirmation Instrument 1995 (S.I. 1995/3266)
- Food (Miscellaneous Revocations and Amendments) Regulations 1995 (S.I. 1995/3267)
- Bristol Development Corporation (Area and Constitution) Order 1995 (S.I. 1995/3269)
- M27 South Coast Motorway (Ower—Chilworth Section) Connecting Roads Scheme 1970 Variation Scheme (No 2) 1995 (S.I. 1995/3270)
- Financial Services Act 1986 (Investment Services) (Extension of Scope of Act) Order 1995 (S.I. 1995/3271)
- Uncertificated Securities Regulations 1995 (S.I. 1995/3272)
- Financial Services Act 1986 (EEA Regulated Markets) (Exemption) Order 1995 (S.I. 1995/3273)
- Vocational Training (Public Financial Assistance and Disentitlement to Tax Relief) (Amendment) Regulations 1995 (S.I. 1995/3274)
- Investment Services Regulations 1995 (S.I. 1995/3275)
- Jobseeker's Allowance (Transitional Provisions) Regulations 1995 (S.I. 1995/3276)
- County Court (Amendment No. 4) Rules 1995 (S.I. 1995/3277)
- County Court (Forms) (Amendment No. 4) Rules 1995 (S.I. 1995/3278)
- National Health Service (Fund-holding Practices) (Functions of Family Health Services Authorities) Regulations 1995 (S.I. 1995/3280)
- Attendance Centre Rules 1995 (S.I. 1995/3281)
- Income-related Benefits Schemes (Widows' etc. Pensions Disregards) Amendment Regulations 1995 (S.I. 1995/3282)
- Combined Probation Areas (Oxfordshire and Buckinghamshire) Order 1995 (S.I. 1995/3283)
- Combined Probation Areas (Greater Manchester) (No. 2) Order 1995 (S.I. 1995/3284)
- Sandwell Healthcare National Health Service Trust (Transfer of Trust Property) Order 1995 (S.I. 1995/3285)
- Personal Equity Plan (Amendment No. 2) Regulations 1995 (S.I. 1995/3287)
- Cod and Whiting (Specified Sea Areas) (Prohibition of Fishing) Order 1995 (S.I. 1995/3293)
- Local Government (Superannuation and Compensation for Redundancy or Premature Retirement) (Scotland) Amendment Regulations 1995 (S.I. 1995/3294)
- Rural Diversification Programme (Scotland) Regulations 1995 (S.I. 1995/3295)
- Duration of Copyright and Rights in Performances Regulations 1995 (S.I. 1995/3297)
- Dual-Use and Related Goods (Export Control) (Amendment No. 2) Regulations 1995 (S.I. 1995/3298)
- Electrical Contracting (London Exhibition Halls) Order 1995 (S.I. 1995/3299)

== 3301–3400 ==
- Local Government Act 1988 (Competition) (Legal and Construction etc. Services) (Police Authorities) Regulations 1995 (S.I. 1995/3302)
- Local Government Act 1988 (Defined Activities) (Exemptions) (Police Authorities) Order 1995 (S.I. 1995/3303)
- Local Authorities (Expenditure Powers) Order 1995 (S.I. 1995/3304)
- Rules of the Supreme Court (Amendment No. 3) 1995 (S.I. 1995/3316)
- Income Support (General) Amendment Regulations 1995 (S.I. 1995/3320)
- Education (Mandatory Awards) Regulations 1995 (S.I. 1995/3321)
- Non-Domestic Rating (Chargeable Amounts) (Amendment No. 3) Regulations 1995 (S.I. 1995/3322)
- Bristol Development Corporation (Dissolution) Order 1995 (S.I. 1995/3323)
- Olympics Association Right (Infringement Proceedings) Regulations 1995 (S.I. 1995/3325)
- Local Government etc. (Scotland) Act 1994 (Commencement No.6 and Saving) Order 1995 (S.I. 1995/3326)
- Roads (Transitional Powers) (Scotland) Amendment Order 1995 (S.I. 1995/3328)
- Sole (Specified Sea Areas) (Prohibition of Fishing) Order 1995 (S.I. 1995/3329)
- Disability Discrimination Act 1995 (Commencement No. 1) Order 1995 (S.I. 1995/3330)
- Town and Country Planning (General Development Procedure) (Welsh Forms) Order 1995 (S.I. 1995/3336)
- Home Energy Conservation Act 1995 (Commencement No. 2) (England) Order 1995 (S.I. 1995/3340)
- Motor Vehicles (Designation of Approval Marks) (Amendment) Regulations 1995 (S.I. 1995/3342)
- Act of Sederunt (Reciprocal Enforcement of Maintenance Orders) (United States of America) 1995 (S.I. 1995/3345)

== See also ==
- List of statutory instruments of the United Kingdom
