= Coal truck =

A coal truck may refer to:

- Bathtub gondola, a type of railway gondola
- Chaldron wagon
- Dumper
- Dump truck
- Haul truck
- Hopper car
- Mine car
- Minecart
- Mineral wagon
- Open wagon

== See also ==
- Coal haul truck (disambiguation)
