= Corf (disambiguation) =

A corf is an underwater container used to hold live fish or crustaceans.

Corf may also refer to:

- Corf (mining), a basket or small wagon used for carrying coal
- Alternate (archaic) spelling of River Corve in Shropshire, England

CORF may refer to

- Commission for Organising the Fortified Regions (La Commission d'organisation des régions fortifiées), a French military organisation
- Combination of receptive fields, a computational model of a simple cell in the visual system
- Cutting off reflected failure CORF and CORFing, the opposite of basking in reflected glory
- Canadian Charter of Rights and Freedoms
