= Corve =

Corve may refer to:

- Corf, an underwater container used to hold live fish or crustaceans
- Corf (mining), a basket or small wagon for transporting coal
- River Corve, in Shropshire, England
