= Slate wagon =

Specialized types of railway wagons

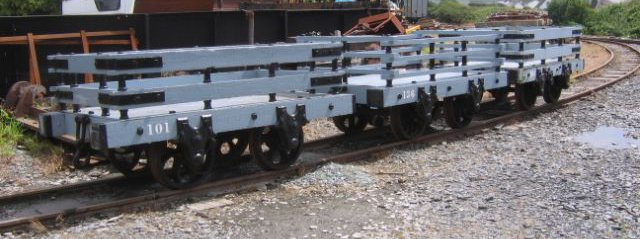
Talyllyn Railway Slate Wagons belonging to the Narrow Gauge Railway Museum

Slate wagons are specialized types of railway wagons designed for the conveyance of slate. The characteristics of this stone led to the development of small open cars that carried the slate in its various forms. These were first developed on the narrow gauge railways serving the slate industry of North Wales in the late 18th century. They were initially used on horse-drawn tramways, but survived with only minor modifications into the days of locomotives and are still to be found in use in the 21st century.

== Types ==
The three most common types of slate wagon are:

=== Slate wagon ===
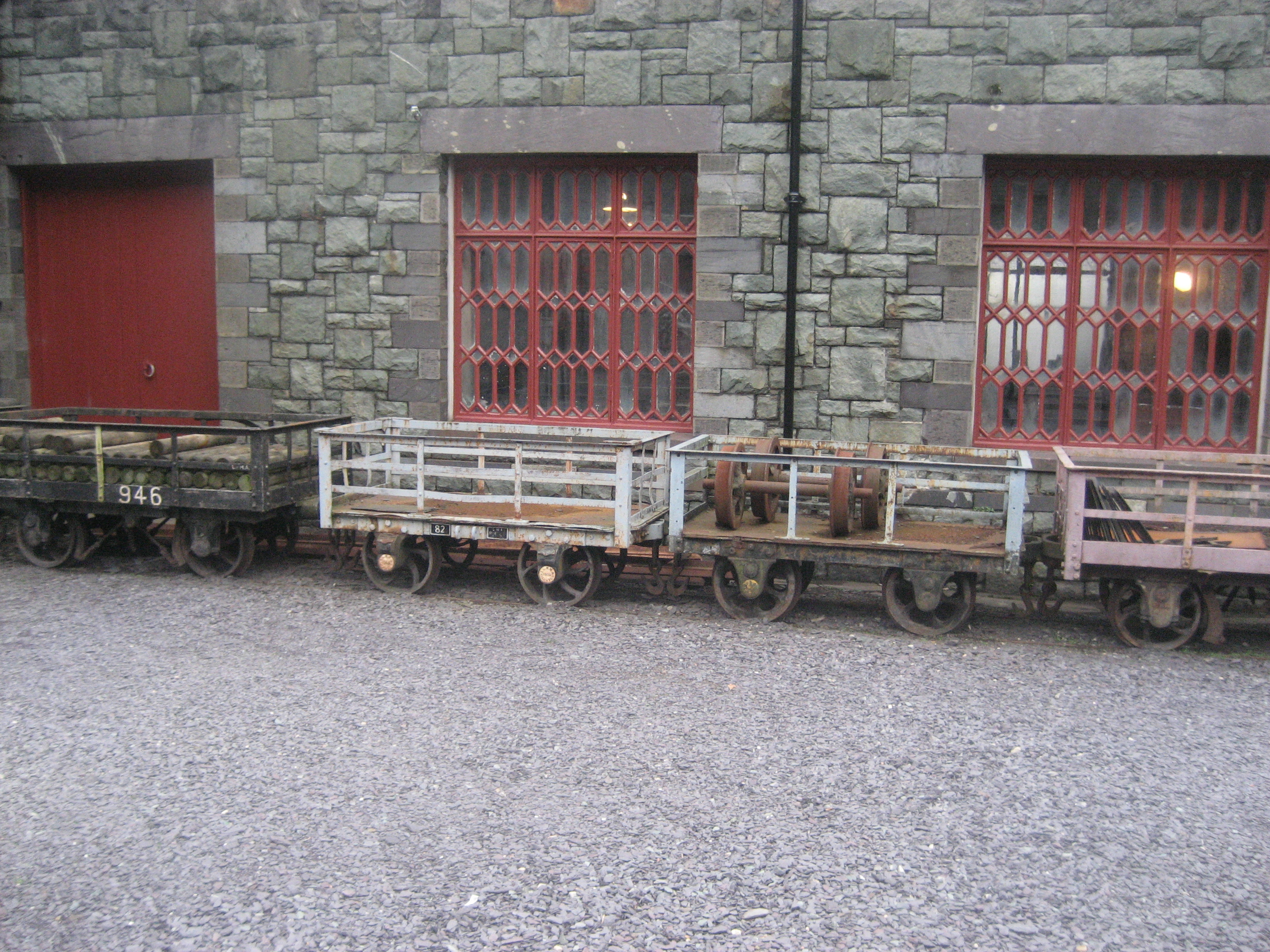
A variety of slate wagons preserved at the National Slate Museum, Llanberis

This is the basic vehicle for transporting roofing slates from the quarry to the destination. Because roofing slates are relatively friable, they are packed vertically into the open slate wagons to reduce the chance they will be broken on their journey. Early designs used simple wooden rails to hold the packed slates. Later these were replaced with iron or steel railed examples of a similar design.

=== Slab wagon ===
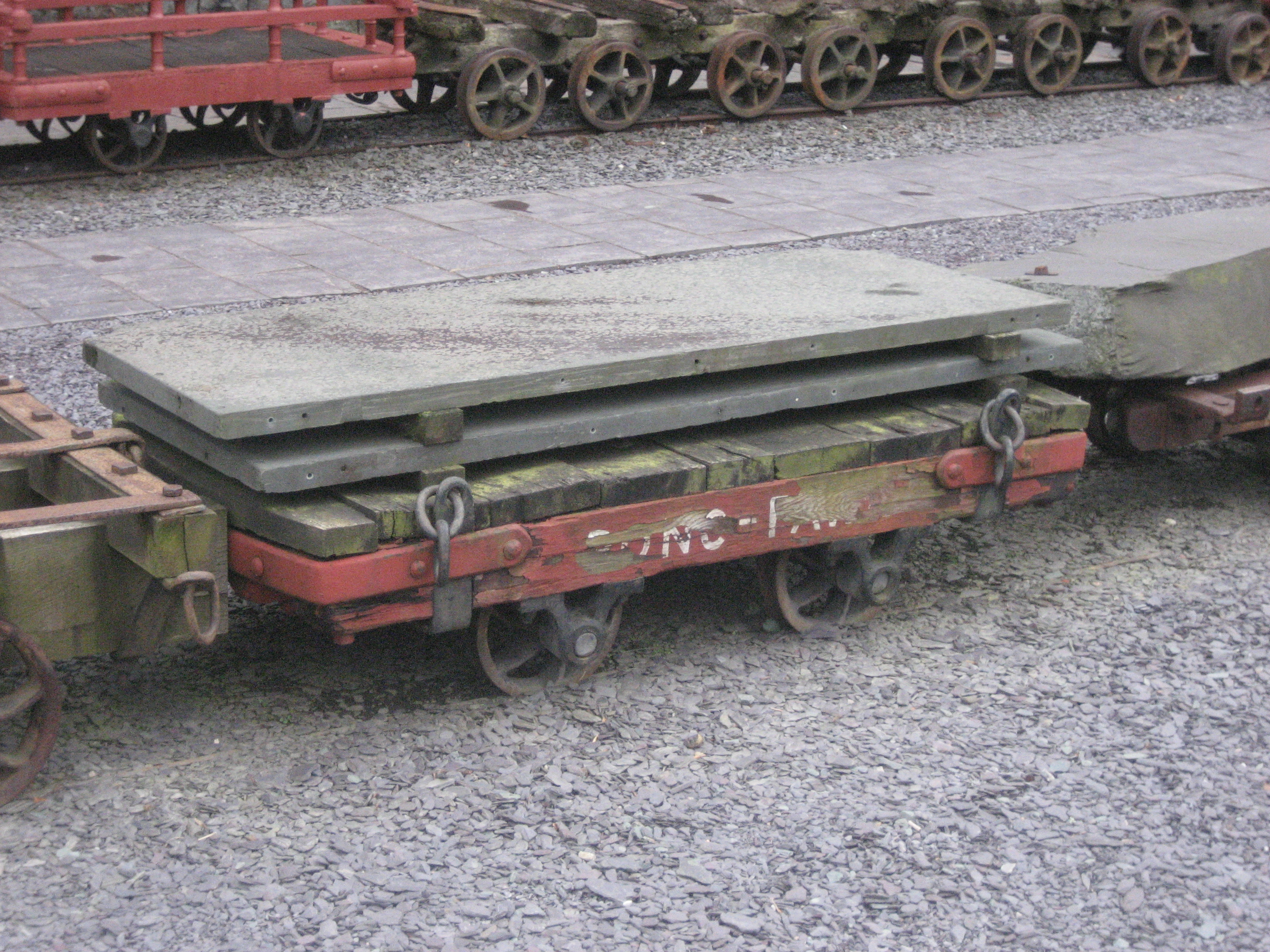
A Dinorwic Quarry slab wagon, now preserved at the National Slate Museum, Llanberis

Slab wagons are designed to carry large uncut slabs of slate, often internally within quarries. The most common form is flat wagon (often referred to as a sled) where the slab is laid horizontally on wooden runners and chained to the wagon. A less common form is the vertical slab wagon, where two slabs are chained to an A-frame mounted on the wagon; this form of slab wagon was most famously used on the Corris Railway though other lines such as the Ffestiniog Railway also had examples of this type.

=== Rubbish wagon ===
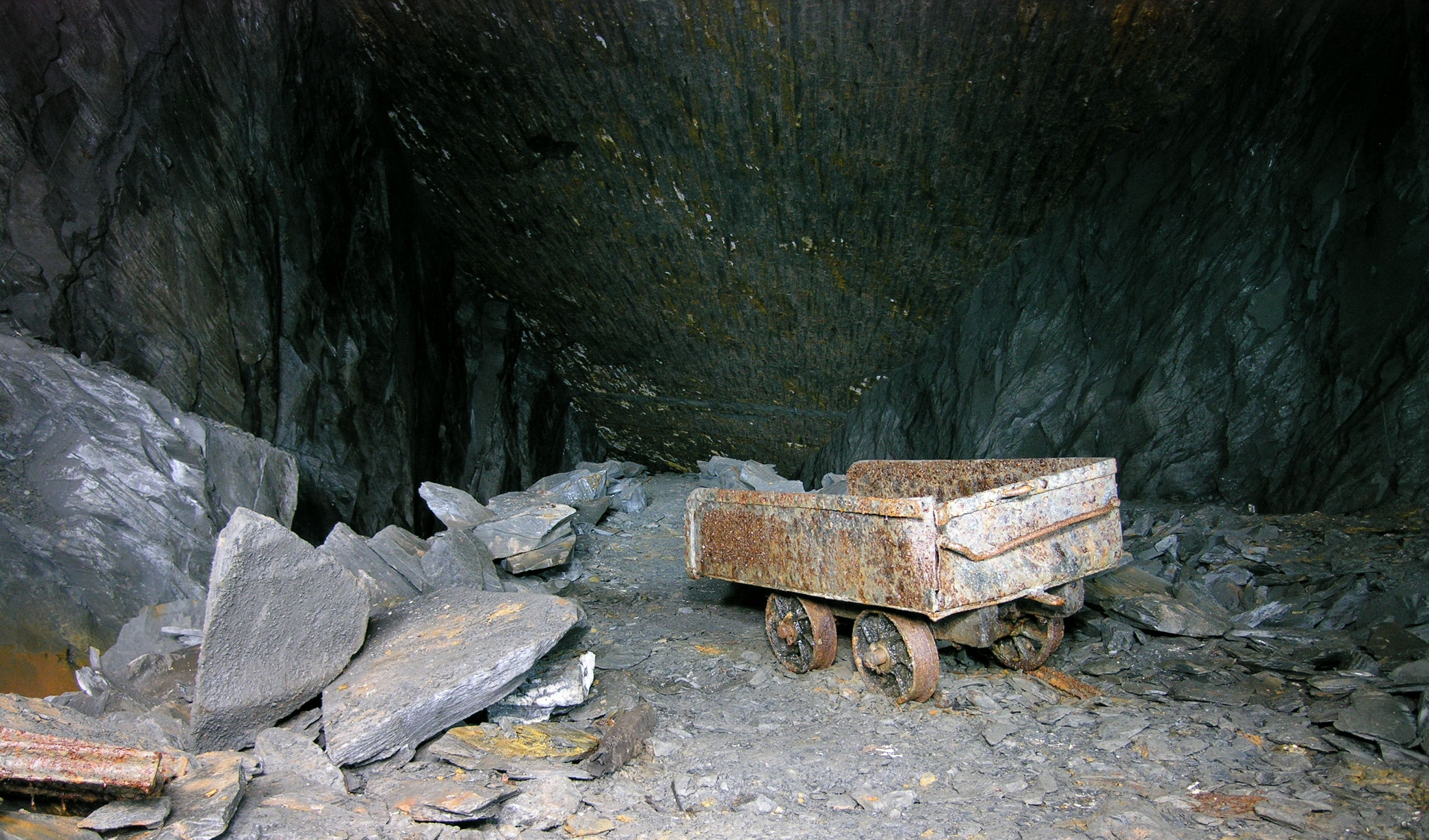
A rubbish wagon, abandoned in a mine near Llangollen

These were used almost exclusively within slate quarries. They transported waste slate from the mills to the dumps. These were often crude vehicles that were heavily abused during service. They typically consisted of a basic flat wagon with a three-sided iron body that held the waste. The waste slate was usually tipped from the wagon onto the slate tips, usually by physically tipping the entire wagon and its contents.

== See also ==
- Flatcar
- Flat wagon
- Mineral wagon
- Quarry tub
