= Pickaxe =

T-shaped hand tool used for prying, digging and as a impromptu weapon

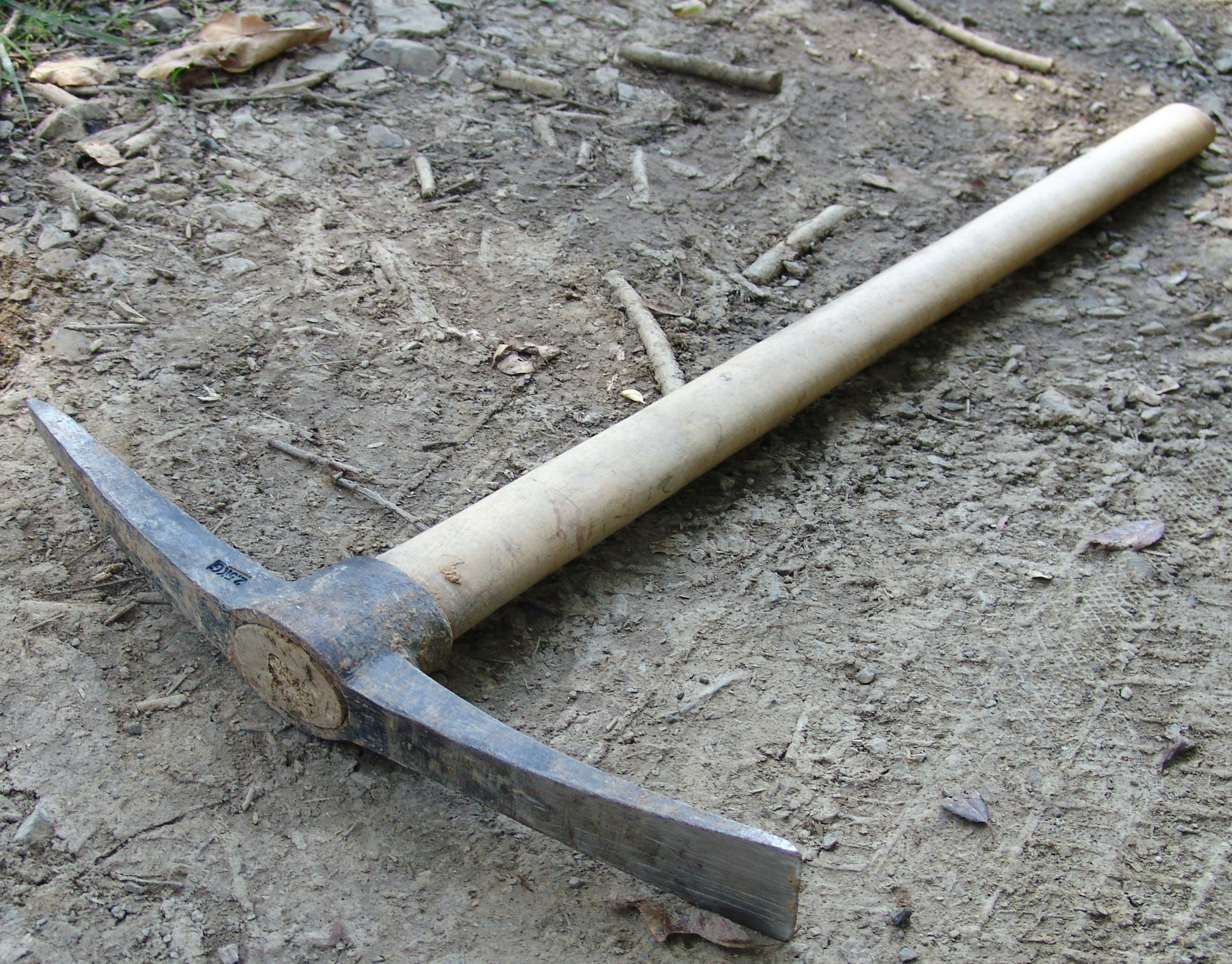
- Pickaxe on the ground
- Other names: Pick, pickax
- Classification: Digging tool
- Types: Railroad pick, miner's pick
- Related: Mattock

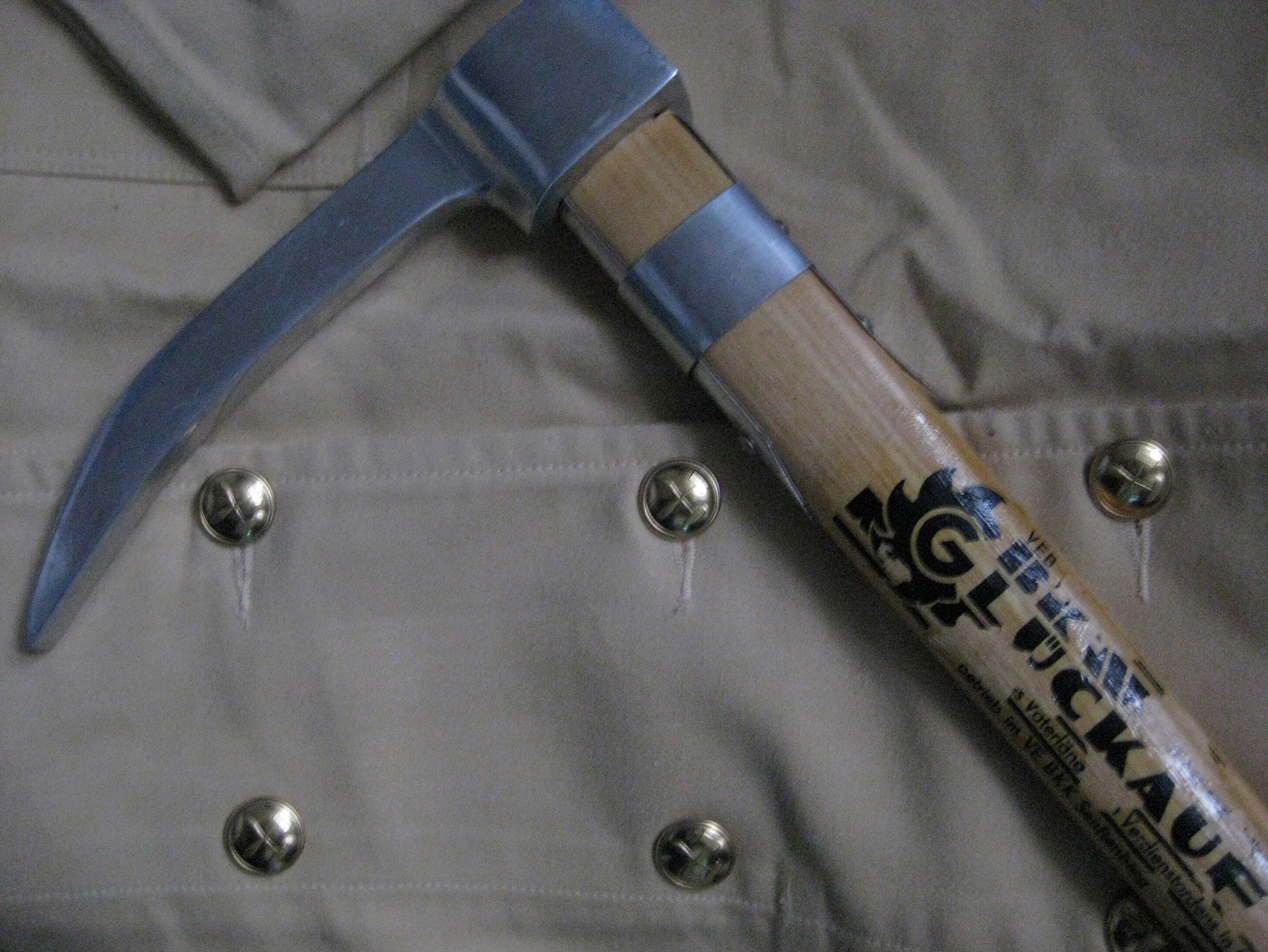
Ceremony hammer of a miner VEB Kombinat Senftenberg (GDR) - with honorary uniform

A pickaxe (American spelling: pickax), pick-axe, or pick is a generally T-shaped hand tool used for digging. Its head is typically metal, attached perpendicularly to a longer handle, traditionally made of wood, occasionally metal, and increasingly fiberglass.

A standard pickaxe, similar to a "pick mattock", has a pointed end on one side of its head and a broad flat "axe" blade opposite. A gradual curve characteristically spans the length of the head. The next most common configuration features two spikes, one slightly longer than the other.

The pointed end is used both for breaking and prying, the axe for hoeing, skimming, and chopping through roots.

Developed as agricultural tools in prehistoric times, picks have evolved into other tools such as the plough and the mattock. They also have been used in general construction and mining, and adapted to warfare.

== Etymology ==
The Oxford Dictionary of English states that both pick and pickaxe have the same meaning, that being a tool with a long handle at right angles to a curved iron or steel bar with a point at one end and a chisel or point at the other, used for breaking up hard ground or rock.

The term pickaxe is a folk etymology alteration of Middle English picas via Anglo-Norman piceis, Old French pocois, and directly from Medieval Latin picosa 'pick', related to Latin picus 'woodpecker'. Though modern picks usually feature a head with both a pointed end and an adze-like flattened blade on the other end, current spelling is influenced by axe, and pickaxe, pick-axe, or sometimes just pick cover any and all versions of the tool.

== History ==
In prehistoric times a large shed deer antler from a suitable species (e.g. red deer) was often cut down to its shaft and its lowest tine and used as a one-pointed pick, and with it sometimes a large animal's shoulder blade as a crude shovel. During war in medieval times, the pickaxe was used as a weapon.

== As a weapon ==
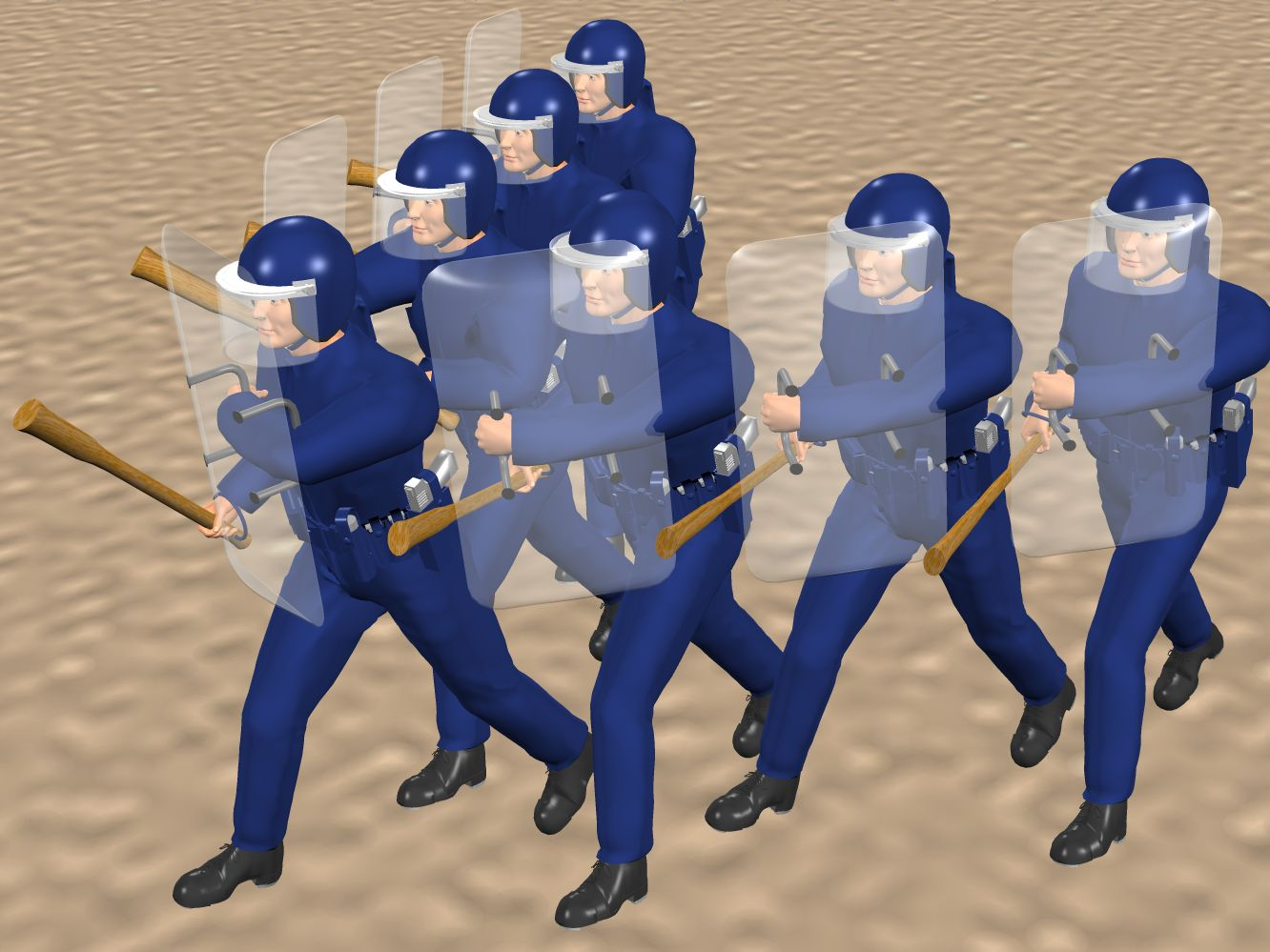
Illustration of pickaxe handles being combined with riot shields

The historic pickaxe was readily adapted to a weapon for hand-to-hand combat in ancient times. Over the centuries aspects of it were incorporated in various battle axes.

A pickaxe handle (sometimes called a "pickhandle" or "pick helve") is sometimes used on its own as a club for bludgeoning. In The Grapes of Wrath by John Steinbeck, pick handles were used against migrant farmers, and Georgia governor Lester Maddox famously threatened to use a similar, more slender axe handle to bar blacks from entering a whites-only restaurant in the heated days of the American civil rights movement of the 1960s.

Pickaxes are commonly carried by Pioneer Sergeants in the British Army.

A normal pickaxe handle is made of ash or hickory wood and is about 3 ft (91 cm) and weighs about 2.5 lb (1.1 kg). British Army pickaxe handles must, by regulation, be exactly 3 ft (91 cm) long, for use in measuring in the field. New variant designs are:

- With a plastic casing on the thick end.
- Made of carbon fibre

They are sometimes made with a steel casing on the thick end.

== See also ==
- Mattock
- Ice axe
- Entrenching tool
