= Coal haul truck =

A coal haul truck may refer to:

- Dumper
- Dump truck
- Haul truck
- Mineral wagon

== See also ==
- Coal truck (disambiguation)
