= Quarry tub =

Railway wagon used at quarries and mines

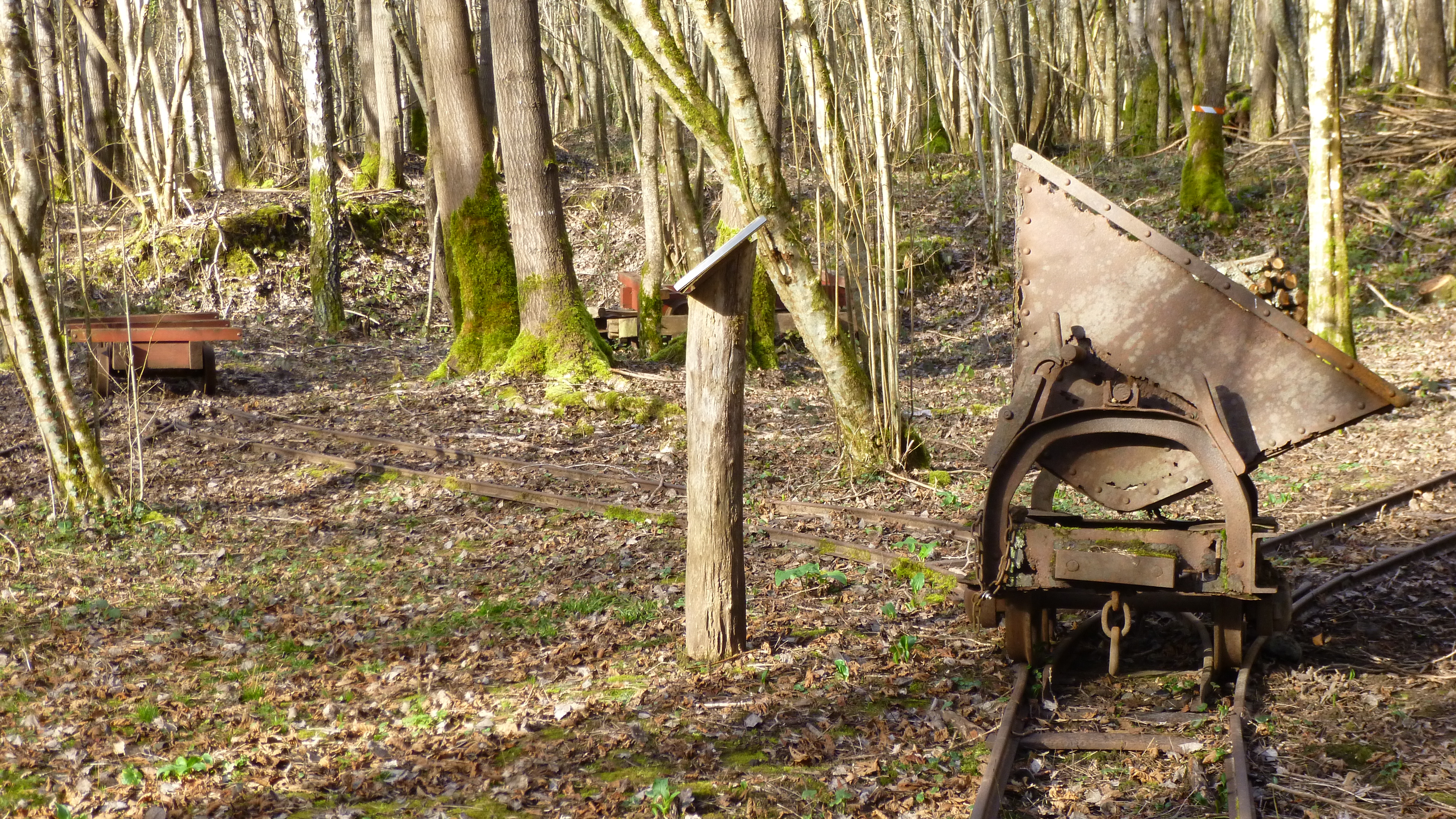
Quarry tub on 1,300 mm (4 ft 3 3/16 in) gauge

A quarry tub or tub is a type of railway or tramway wagon used in quarries and other industrial locations for the transport of minerals (such as coal, sand, ore, clay and stone) from a quarry or mine face to processing plants or between various parts of an industrial site. This type of wagon may be small enough for one person to push, or designed for haulage by a horse, or for connection in a train hauled by a locomotive. The tubs are designed for ease of emptying, usually by a side-tipping action. This type of rail vehicle is now mainly obsolete, its function having been mostly replaced by conveyor belts.

== See also ==
- British narrow gauge railways
- Chaldron
- Corf
- Decauville wagon
- Mine car
- Minecart
- Mineral wagon
- Mine railway
