= Chaldron =

Unit of volume

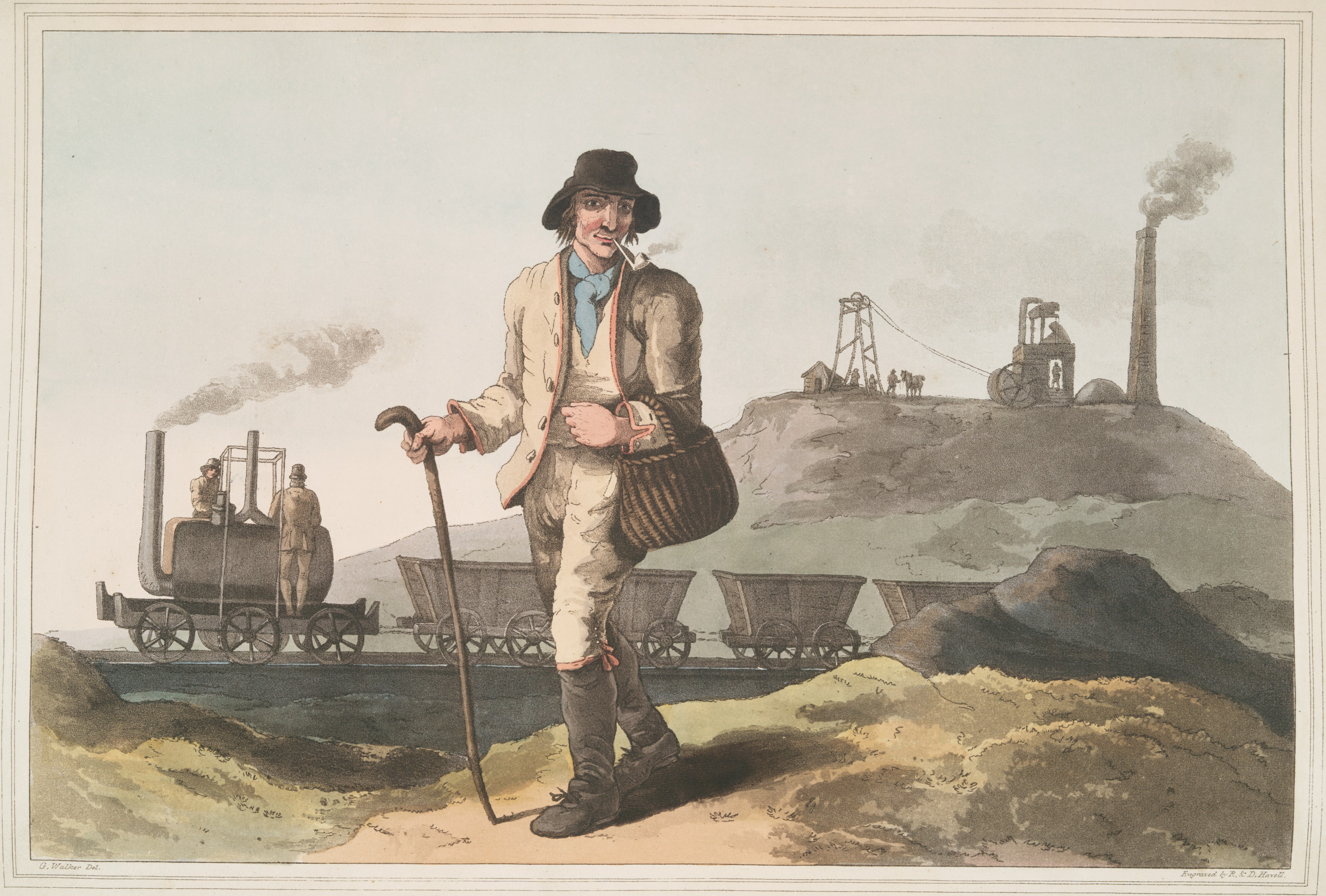
John Blenkinsop's pioneering locomotive pulling several chaldrons (1813).

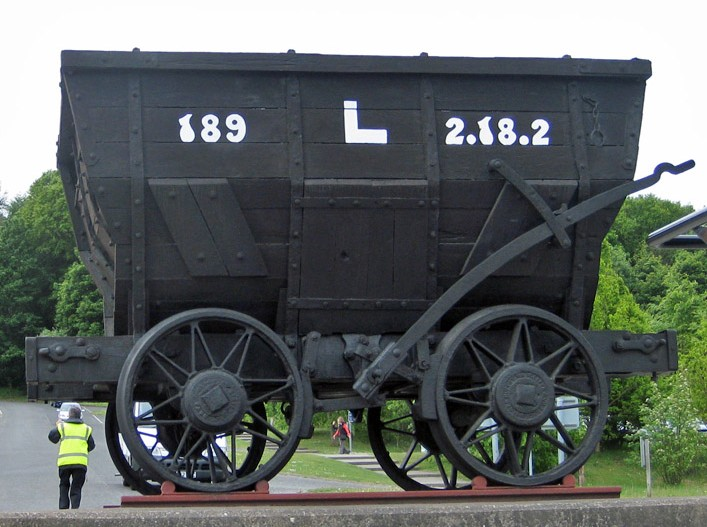
Chaldron waggon at Beamish. The long brake lever is for control when running down to the staith by gravity. Note that the perspective of this photo makes the chaldron seem much larger than it is.

A chaldron (also chauldron or chalder) was an English measure of dry volume, mostly used for coal; the word itself is an obsolete spelling of cauldron. It was used from the 13th century onwards, nominally until 1963, when it was abolished by the Weights and Measures Act 1963, but in practice until the end of 1835, when the Weights and Measures Act 1835 specified that thenceforth coal could only be sold by weight.

== Coal ==
The chaldron was used as the measure for coal from the 13th century, measuring by volume being much more practical than weighing low-value, high-bulk commodities like coal. It was not standardized, and there were many different regional chaldrons, the two most important being the Newcastle and London chaldrons. The Newcastle chaldron was used to measure all coal shipped from Northumberland and Durham, and the London chaldron became the standard measure for coal in the east and south of England.

Many attempts have been made to calculate the weight of a Newcastle chaldron as used in medieval and early modern times. Coal industry historian John Nef has estimated that in 1421 it weighed 2,000 lb (907 kg), and that its weight was gradually increased by coal traders due to the taxes on coal (which were charged per chaldron) until 1678, when its weight was fixed by law at 52 1/2 long hundredweight (5,880 lb; 2,670 kg), later increased in 1694 to 53 long hundredweight (5,940 lb; 2,690 kg).

A London chaldron, on the other hand, was defined as "36 bushels heaped up, each bushel to contain a Winchester bushel and 1 imperial quart (1.14 L; 1.20 US qt), and to be 19 1/2 inches (495 mm) in diameter". This approximated a weight in coal of around 28 long hundredweight or 3,140 lb or 1,420 kg.

The chaldron was the legal limit for horse-drawn coal waggons travelling by road as it was considered that heavier loads would cause too much damage to the roadways. Railways had standard "chauldron waggons" which were about 10 ft (3.05 m) and around 6 ft 3 in (1.91 m) high.

The value of a chaldron of coal depended on the size of the lumps of coal and also their water content. Unscrupulous merchants would purchase their coal in lumps as large as possible then sell them in smaller sizes. This was abolished by the Weights and Measures Act 1835, which legislated that from January 1836 coal was only to be sold by weight.

== See also ==
- Chalder
- Corf (mining)
- Decauville wagon
- Mine car
- Minecart
- Mineral wagon
- Quarry tub
