= Stew pond =

Pond for storing live fish

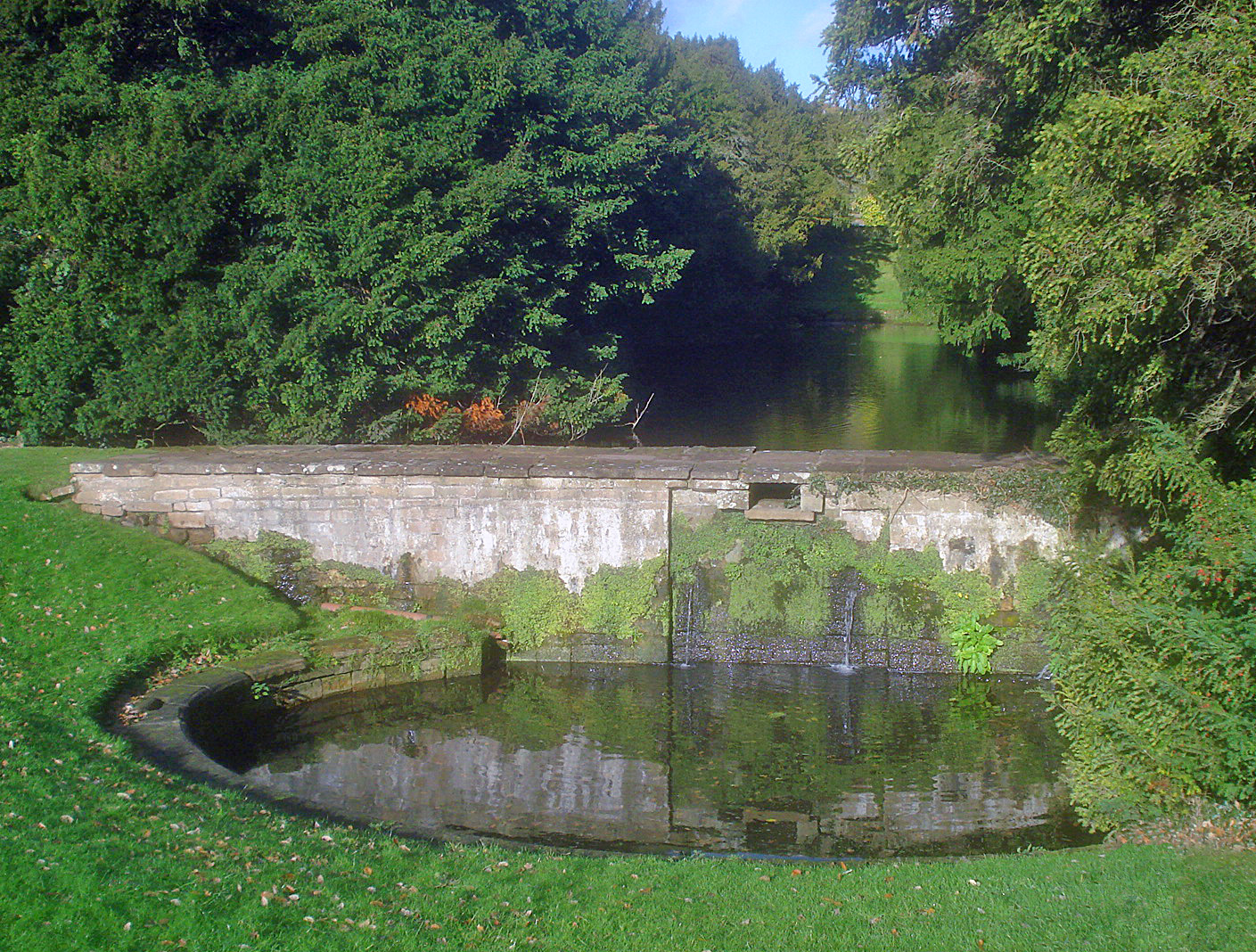
Stew pond at Newstead Abbey, a former Augustinian priory in Nottinghamshire, England

A stew pond or stewpond or stew is a fish pond used to store live fish ready for eating.

In medieval Europe, monasteries often maintained attached stews to supply fish over the winter.

== See also ==
- Ancient Hawaiian aquaculture
- Corf
