= Traditional mining =

Mining using simple manual tools

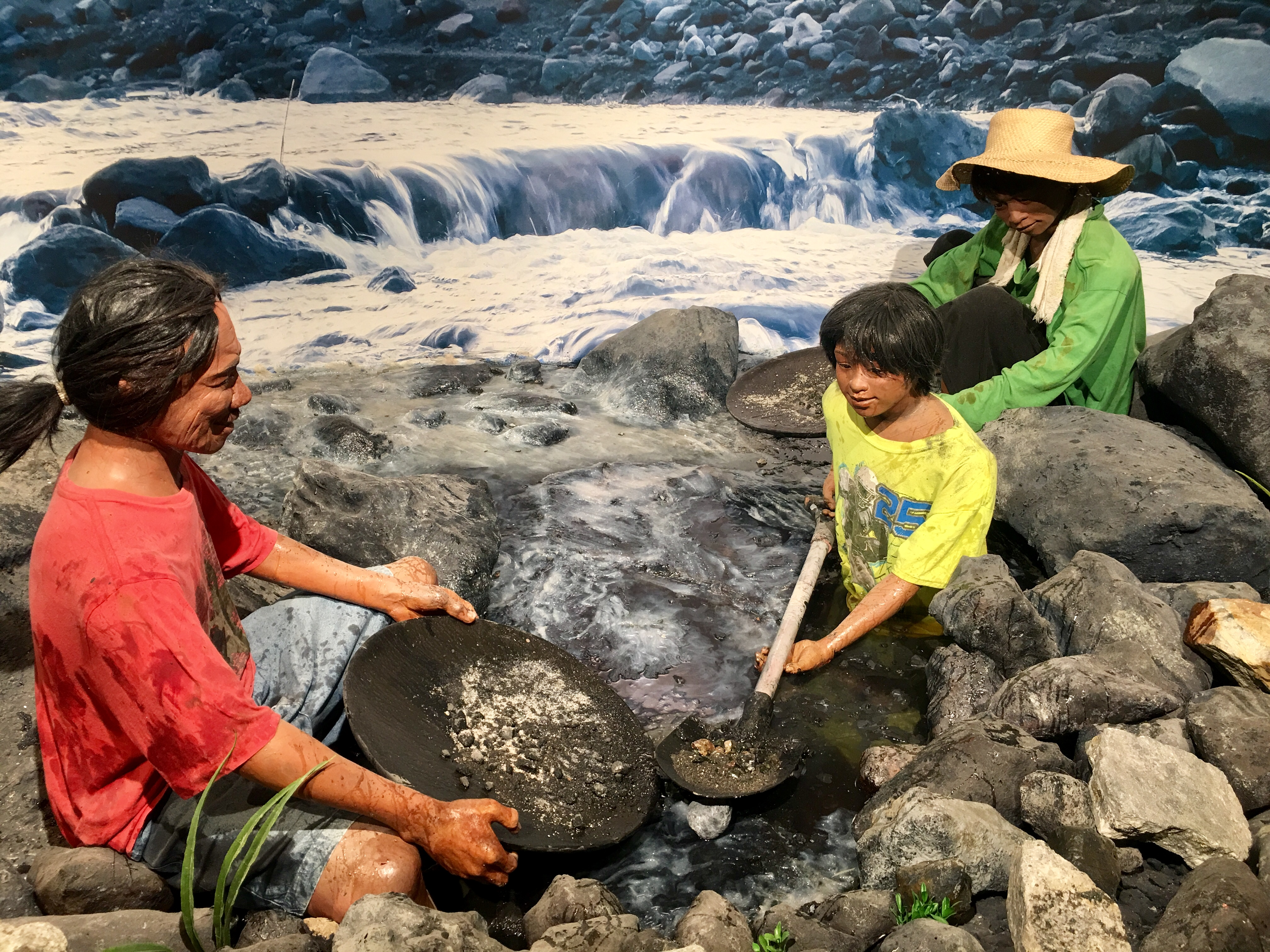
Diorama of traditional mining at Philippine National Museum

Traditional mining, also known as old-school mining, is a mining method involving the use of simple manual tools, such as shovels, pickaxes, hammers, chisels and pans. It is done in both surface and underground environments. Until the early 1900s, traditional mining was widely used throughout the world. It is still a used mining method in some countries, including Colombia and Peru in South America and Niger in Africa. In traditional surface and underground mining, hammers and chisels with pickaxes and shovels are used. Minecarts are used to move ore and other materials in the process of mining. Pans are used for placer mining operations, such as gold panning. The traditional method of cracking rock was fire-setting, which involved heating the rock with fire to expand it. Once the rock was heated by fire it was quenched with water to break it. Fire-setting was one of the most effective rock breaking methods until 1867 when Alfred Nobel invented dynamite.

Traditional mining operations have created some of the largest handmade features on Earth, such as the Big Hole open pit mine in South Africa, which is claimed to be the largest hole on Earth excavated by hand.

== See also ==
- Pallaqueo – hand-selection of ore
- Pirquinero – traditional miners in Argentina, Bolivia and Chile
