= Gondola (rail) =

Open-top railroad freight car

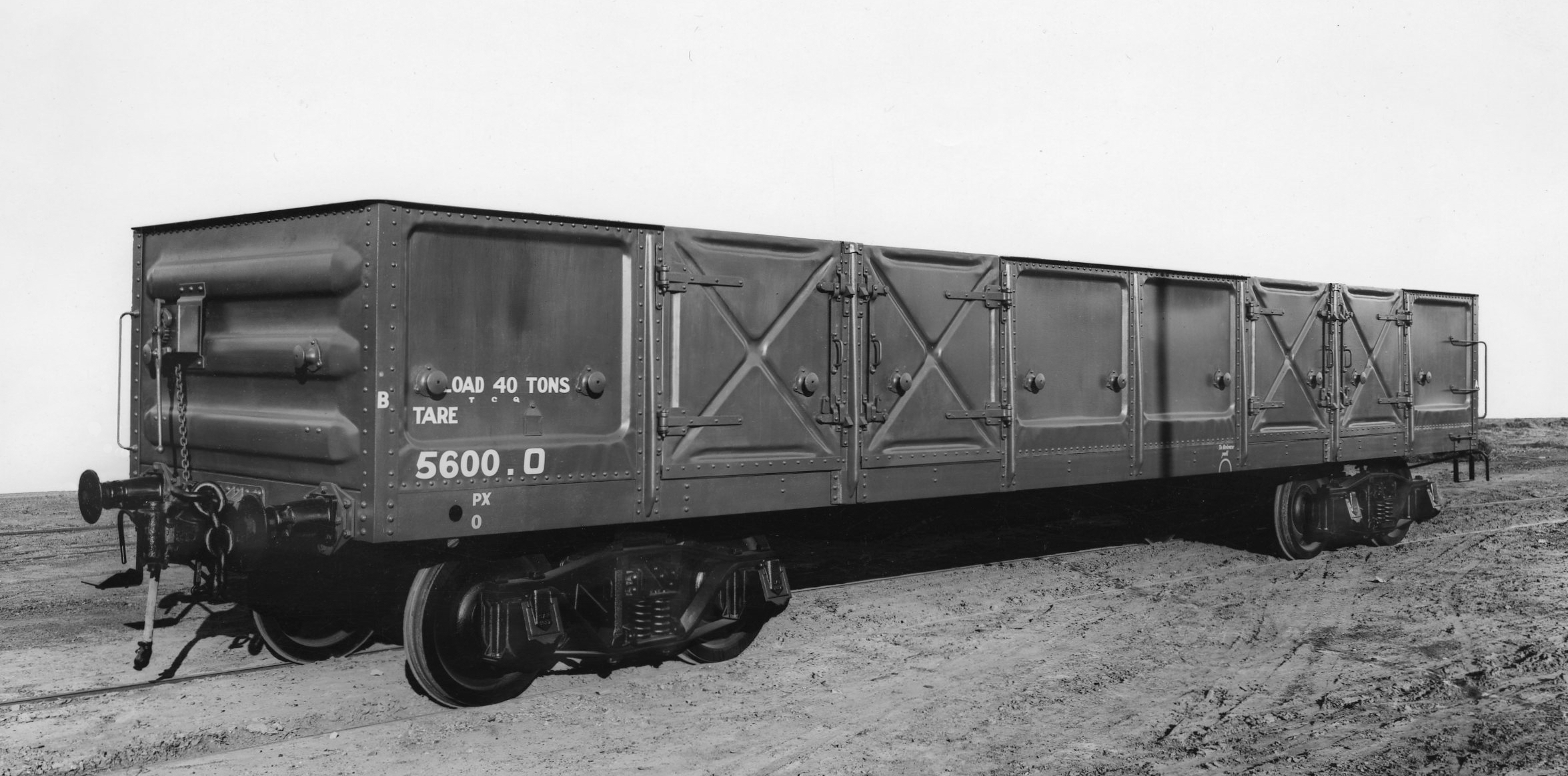
A gondola car built by the South Australian Railways in the 1920s to an American Car and Foundry design

In North American railroad terminology, (Note: The terminology is also followed in railroads influenced by North American practice, such as in South America and, in Australia, railways in the Pilbara mining region (Western Australia) and the South Australian Railways.) a gondola car or gondola is typically an open-topped railroad car used for transporting loose bulk materials, although general freight was also carried in the pre-container era. Because of their low side walls, gondola cars are also suitable for the carriage of such high-density cargos as steel plates or coils, or of bulky items such as prefabricated sections of rail track. Gondola cars are distinct from hopper cars in that they do not have doors on their floor to empty cargo.

== History ==
The first gondola cars in North America were developed in the 1830s and used primarily to carry coal. Early gondolas were little more than flatcars with wooden sides added, and were typically small – 30 feet (9.1 m) or less in length, and 15 short tons (13 long tons; 14 t) or less in weight. Those cars were not widely used at first, because they could only be unloaded by workers shoveling out the cargo by hand, a slow and labor-intensive process. A solution to the problem was developed around the 1860s with the drop-bottom gondola: hatches were installed in the floor which could be opened at the destination, and workers using shovels directed cargo towards the hatches. Although it was an improvement over earlier gondolas, it still required manual unloading.

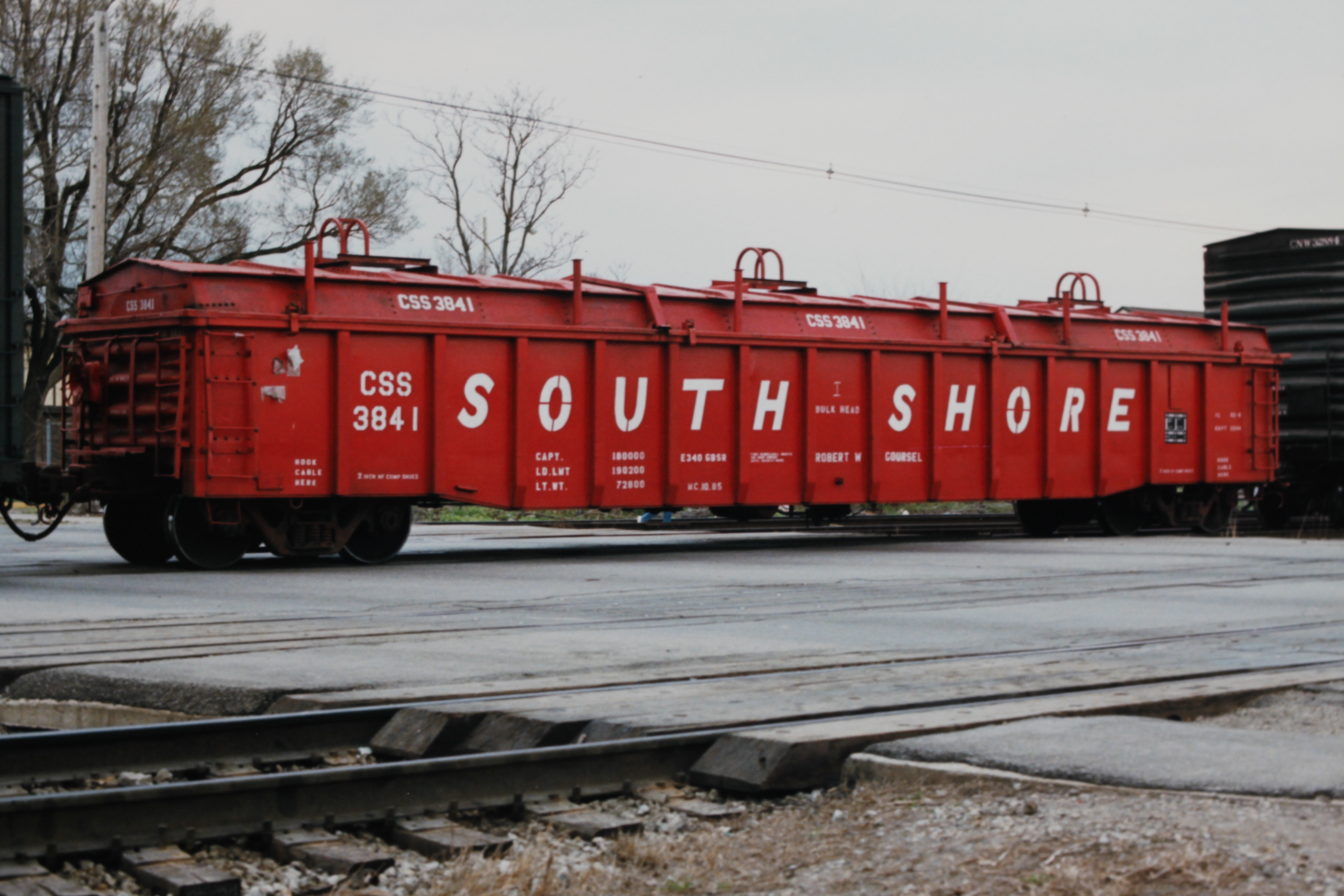
This covered gondola protects its cargo from exposure to moisture while in transit.

After the American Civil War, advances in technology, especially the development of steel, allowed new and larger gondola designs. New gondolas were built with steel sides and frames, although wood was retained for flooring since it was flexible and cheap to replace. The cars were often built to lengths between 40 and 50 feet (12 and 15 m), and gradually increased in capacity from around 30 short tons (27 long tons; 27 t) to as much as 70 short tons (63 long tons; 64 t) by the early to mid 20th century.

Gondola cars began to be built for specialized purposes and, depending on their intended cargo, the side heights could range from just two feet (0.61 m) for bulk commodities such as sand, to six feet (1.83 m) or more for loads such as pipes, and ten feet (3.0 m) or more for light cargos such as woodchips. Covered gondolas were also developed for cargos that had to be protected from the elements, such as newly milled steel. Increasingly, present-day loose-material loads are covered by airtight covers to minimize air pollution. Starting in the 1950s and 1960s, high-sided gondolas were used for coal, thanks to stronger car construction and the invention of rotary car dumpers, which allowed those gondolas to be emptied automatically.

== Specialized car types ==
=== Rotary gondola cars ===
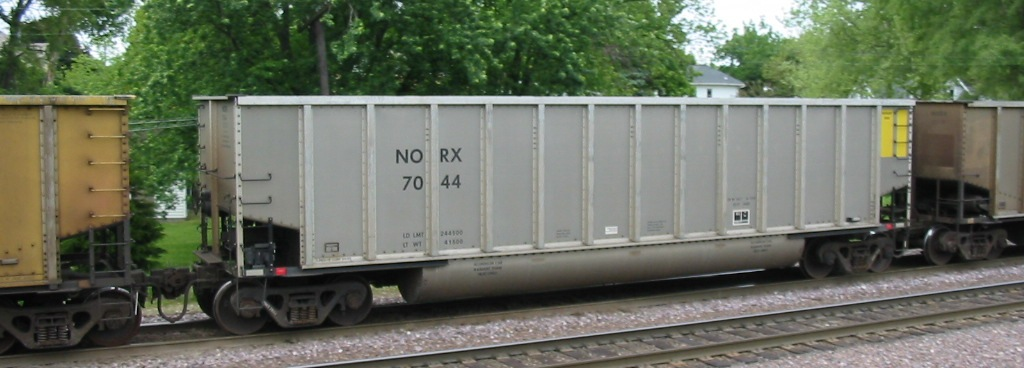
A bathtub gondola passing through Rochelle, Illinois, in 2005

In the second half of the 20th century, coal haulage shifted from open hopper cars to high-sided gondola cars, which allowed a larger amount of coal per car since gondola cars do not include the equipment needed for unloading. However, since these cars do not have hatches for unloading the products shipped in them, railroads have used rotary car dumpers (mechanisms that hold a car against a short section of track while the car and track are slowly rotated upside down to empty the car) or other means to empty them. Such cars can be equipped with couplers that are free to rotate to allow dumping while the car is still coupled; a "double rotary" car has rotary couplers on both ends to allow it to be unloaded while it remains coupled to cars at each end. Rotary gondola cars are often nicknamed "bathtub gondolas" on account of their shape.

=== Coil car ===
The coil car is a modified gondola designed specifically for carrying coils of metal.

=== Track ballast gondolas ===
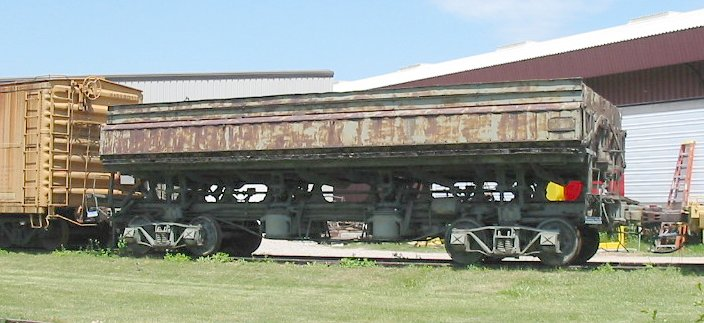
A side-dump gondola on display at the US National Railroad Museum

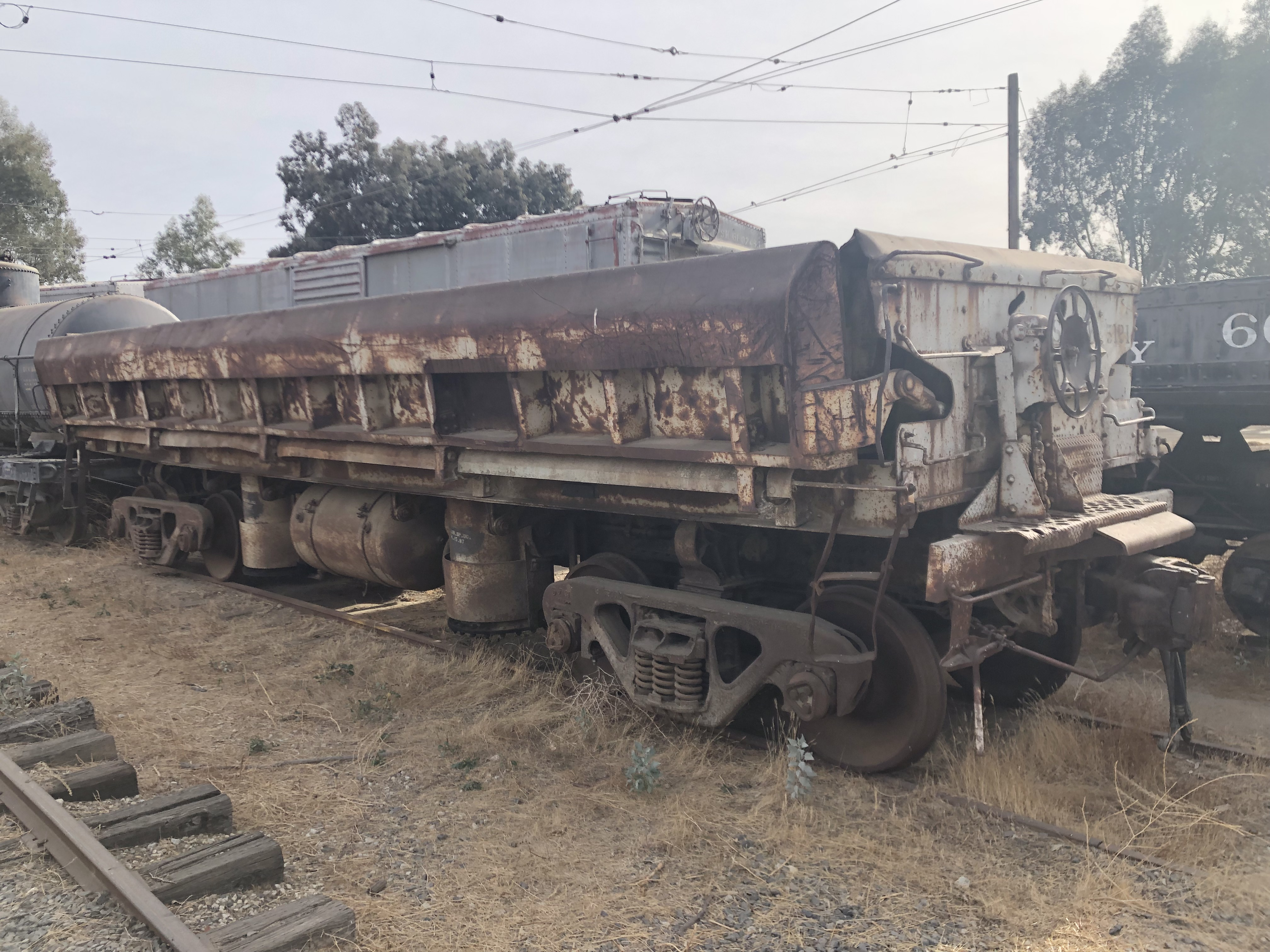
Southern Pacific air-dump car (SPMW 5121), at the Southern California Railway Museum. The whole body of the car is tilted up by pistons in the vertical cylinders under the car. The sides of the car tilt down to be in line with the floor, enabling the load to flow out.

Air-dump cars sometimes carry ballast. These gondolas are side-tipping, so they often are used to carry rock or dirt to add to an embankment, rather than dump crushed-rock ballast between the ties. Ballast is usually carried in bottom-door hopper cars, so that the ballast is dumped directly below the car, rather than to the side.

== See also ==
- Corf
- Decauville wagon
- Minecart § Lorry or mine car
- Mineral wagon
- Mine railway
- Quarry tub
- Railgon Company
- Well car
