= Commission for Organising the Fortified Regions =

French military organization

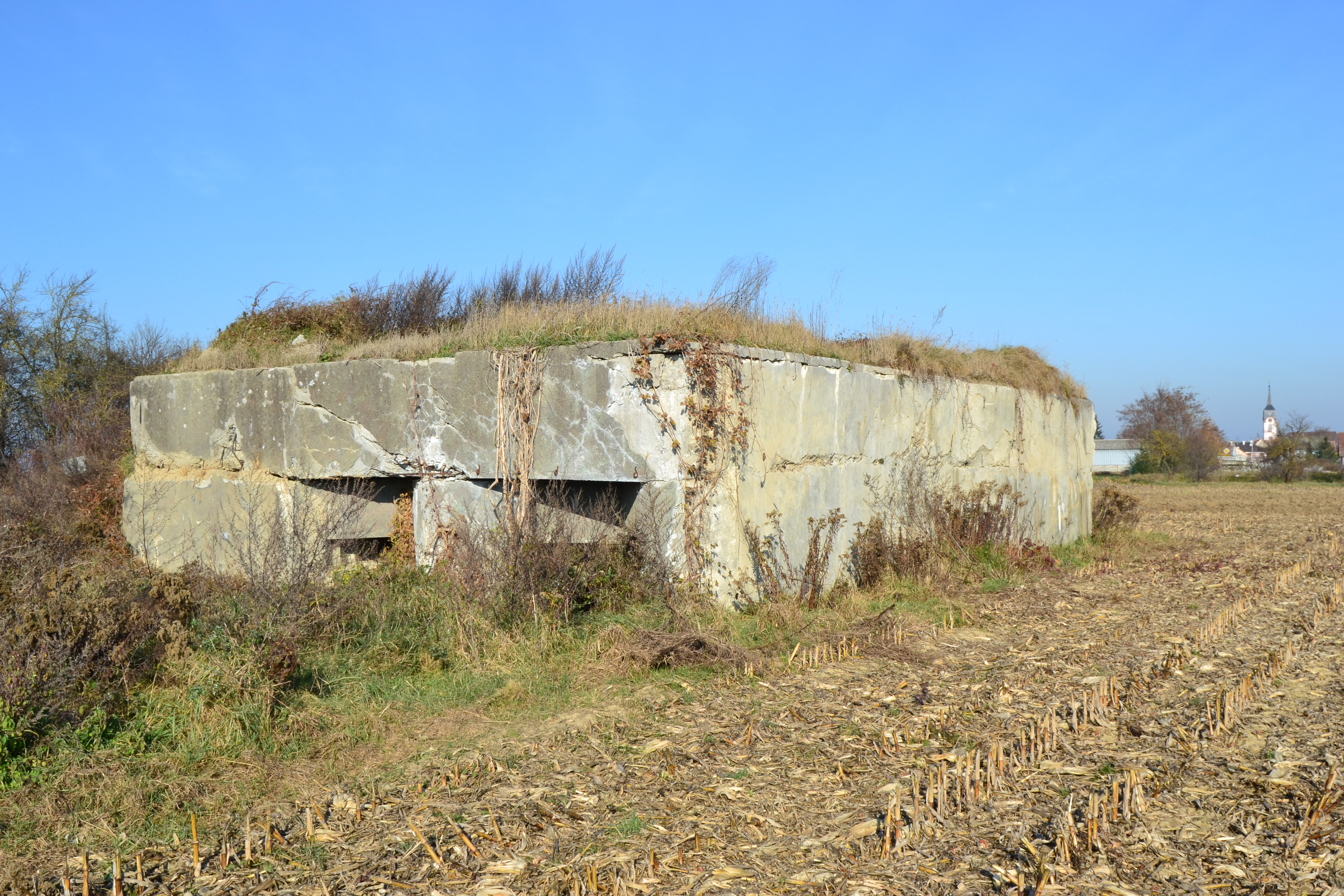
Casemate 593 Bantzenheim sud

The Commission for Organizing the Fortified Regions (French: La Commission d'organisation des régions fortifiées (CORF)) is a French military organization created on 30 September 1927 by the Minister of War Paul Painlevé to study and carry out border fortification. Its creation was not a spontaneous decision but the result of a long and deep reflection on how best to defend the borders of France.

The acronym CORF also refers to a type of fortification, be it ouvrage (earthwork), bunker, observatory or shelter, whose plans were drawn up by the commission and form the most powerful part of the Maginot Line.

== See also ==
- Maginot Line
