= List of listed buildings in Kilmorack =

This is a list of listed buildings in the parish of Kilmorack in Highland, Scotland. This contains the town of Beauly, as well as an area extending to the west along the north side of the River Beauly, including Struy, Cannich, and Glen Affric.

== List ==
Name	Location	Date Listed	Grid Ref. (Note: Sometimes known as OSGB36, the grid reference (where provided) is based on the British national grid reference system used by the Ordnance Survey. • "Guide to National Grid". Ordnance Survey. • "Get-a-map". Ordnance Survey.)	Geo-coordinates	Notes	LB Number (Note: Historic Environment Scotland assign a unique alphanumeric identifier to each designated site in Scotland, for listed buildings this always begins with "LB", for example "LB12345".)	Image
Hawthorn and 25 Ferry Road	Beauly			57°28′59″N 4°27′30″W	Category C(S)	7107	Upload Photo
29 Ferry Road (Cherry Tree Cottage)	Beauly			57°28′58″N 4°27′29″W	Category C(S)	7109	Upload Photo
Lovat Arms Hotel	Beauly			57°28′59″N 4°27′40″W	Category B	7130	Upload another image
52, 54 High Street	Beauly			57°29′04″N 4°27′34″W	Category B	7133	Upload Photo
1 Priory Court, The Square	Beauly			57°29′03″N 4°27′31″W	Category C(S)	7134	Upload Photo
Matheson's Bakery, The Square	Beauly			57°29′00″N 4°27′34″W	Category C(S)	7139	Upload Photo
St Mary's Roman Catholic Church, Burial Ground and Presbytery	Beauly			57°29′10″N 4°27′28″W	Category B	7111	Upload another image See more images
Fasnakyle Power Station, Glen Affric Hydro Electric Scheme	By Cannich			57°19′34″N 4°47′39″W	Category A	7118	Upload another image See more images
Old Burial Ground	Kilmorack			57°27′49″N 4°30′48″W	Category C(S)	7123	Upload Photo
Gate Lodge, Aigas House	Aigas			57°26′20″N 4°33′53″W	Category C(S)	7126	Upload another image
4-12(inclusive nos) Priory Court, The Square	Beauly			57°29′02″N 4°27′31″W	Category C(S)	7136	Upload Photo
Knockfin House	By Tomich			57°18′03″N 4°49′26″W	Category C(S)	7101	Upload Photo
Ardmor House, The Square	Beauly			57°29′00″N 4°27′34″W	Category C(S)	7104	Upload Photo
27 Ferry Road (Roselea)	Beauly			57°28′59″N 4°27′29″W	Category C(S)	7108	Upload Photo
Netherdale	Beauly			57°28′52″N 4°27′52″W	Category C(S)	7110	Upload Photo
Well House Farm	By Beauly			57°29′29″N 4°28′02″W	Category B	7112	Upload Photo
Mill	Cannich			57°20′46″N 4°45′22″W	Category B	7116	Upload Photo
Glen Affric Lodge	Glen Affric			57°15′39″N 5°00′45″W	Category A	7121	Upload another image See more images
Old Manse and Steading	Kilmorack			57°27′53″N 4°30′52″W	Category B	7124	Upload Photo
Monar Dam And Deanie Tunnel Intake Tower, Glen Affric Hydro Electric Scheme	Glen Strathfarrar			57°24′32″N 4°59′35″W	Category B	51702	Upload another image See more images
Comar	Cannich			57°20′30″N 4°46′18″W	Category C(S)	7113	Upload Photo
Cannich Church Of Scotland	Cannich			57°20′47″N 4°46′01″W	Category C(S)	7114	Upload Photo
Marydale Roman Catholic Church, Presbytery and Former School	Cannich			57°20′45″N 4°45′30″W	Category B	7115	Upload Photo
Fasnakyle Bridge Over River Glass	By Cannich			57°19′27″N 4°47′30″W	Category B	7119	Upload another image See more images
Campbell and Co, High Street	Beauly			57°28′58″N 4°27′37″W	Category C(S)	7131	Upload another image
2 and 3 Priory Court, The Square	Beauly			57°29′03″N 4°27′31″W	Category C(S)	7135	Upload Photo
Market Cross, The Square	Beauly			57°29′03″N 4°27′33″W	Category B	49635	Upload another image See more images
Old Parish Church and Burial Ground	Kilmorack			57°27′51″N 4°30′42″W	Category B	7122	Upload another image See more images
Beauly Priory	Beauly			57°29′05″N 4°27′28″W	Category A	7129	Upload another image See more images
Former School and Schoolhouse	Struy			57°25′05″N 4°40′09″W	Category B	7103	Upload another image
Culloch House, The Square	Beauly			57°29′00″N 4°27′35″W	Category C(S)	7105	Upload Photo
Glassburn	Strathglass			57°22′17″N 4°42′51″W	Category B	7120	Upload Photo
Former Free Church and Enclosing Walls	Wester Balblair			57°28′15″N 4°29′18″W	Category C(S)	7128	Upload another image See more images
Commercial Hotel, Commercial Street	Beauly			57°29′02″N 4°27′32″W	Category C(S)	7137	Upload Photo
Smithy Cottage	Crask of Aigas			57°26′41″N 4°33′19″W	Category C(S)	49020	Upload Photo
Eileanaigas House	Eilean Aigas			57°26′28″N 4°33′09″W	Category B	7117	Upload another image
Druim Cottage	Crask of Aigas			57°26′44″N 4°33′18″W	Category C(S)	7127	Upload Photo
Mullardoch Dam, Glen Affric Hydro Electric Scheme	Glen Cannich			57°20′17″N 4°57′18″W	Category B	51703	Upload another image See more images
Bank Of Scotland	Beauly			57°29′01″N 4°27′38″W	Category B	7106	Upload another image
Aigas House (now Aigas Field Centre)	Aigas			57°26′14″N 4°34′03″W	Category B	7125	Upload another image
3, 4 High Street	Beauly			57°29′01″N 4°27′36″W	Category C(S)	7132	Upload Photo
Beaufort House, The Square	Beauly			57°29′01″N 4°27′33″W	Category C(S)	7138	Upload Photo
Corf House	By Lovat Bridge			57°28′11″N 4°28′36″W	Category B	7102	Upload Photo

== Key ==
The scheme for classifying buildings in Scotland is:

- Category A: "buildings of national or international importance, either architectural or historic; or fine, little-altered examples of some particular period, style or building type."
- Category B: "buildings of regional or more than local importance; or major examples of some particular period, style or building type, which may have been altered."
- Category C: "buildings of local importance; lesser examples of any period, style, or building type, as originally constructed or moderately altered; and simple traditional buildings which group well with other listed buildings."

In March 2016 there were 47,288 listed buildings in Scotland. Of these, 8% were Category A, and 50% were Category B, with the remaining 42% being Category C.

== See also ==
- List of listed buildings in Highland
