= Minecart =

Type of rail vehicle used with mine railways

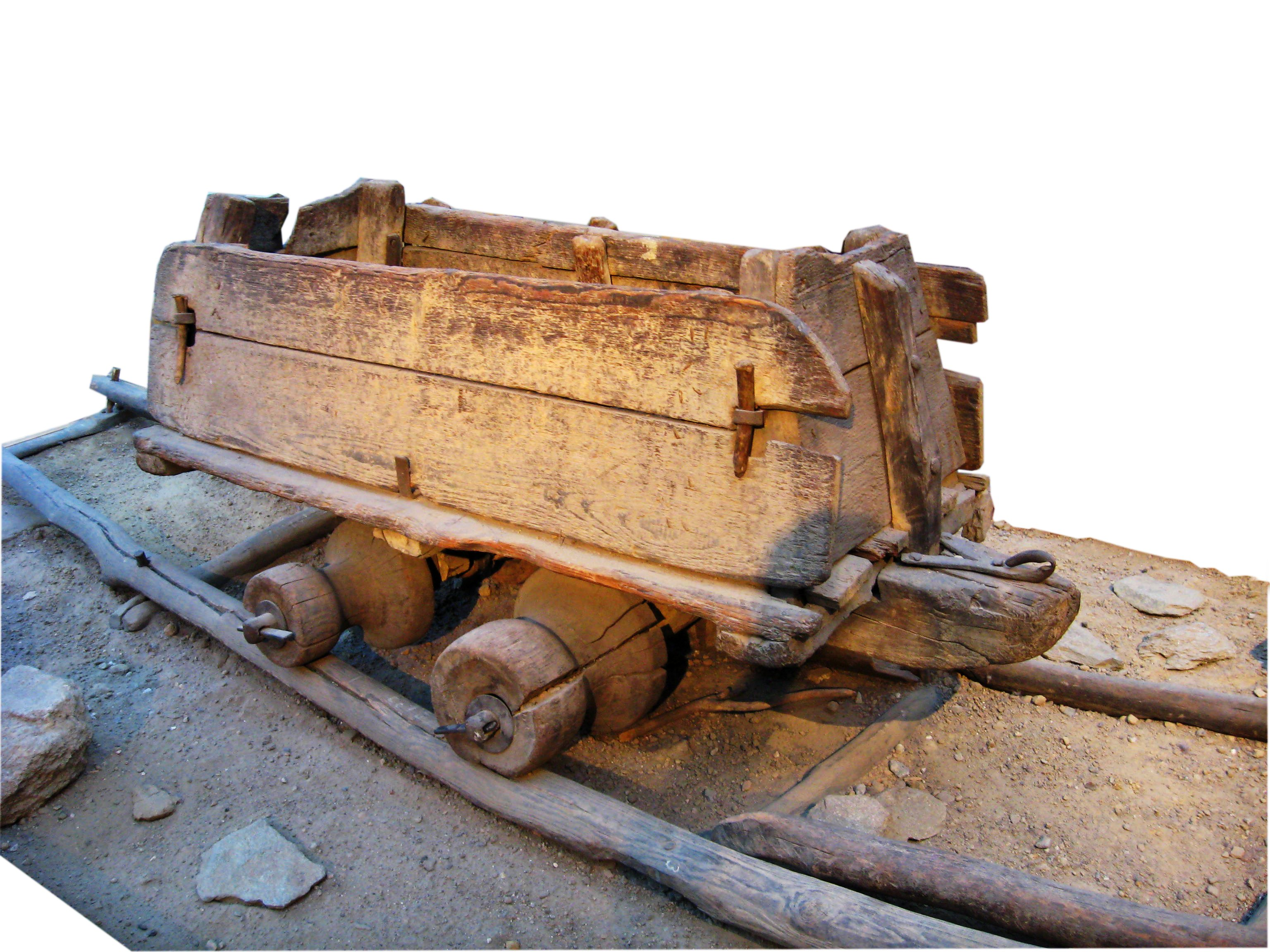
A minecart from the 16th century, found in Transylvania where German miners from Saxony settled, which brought with them the technology

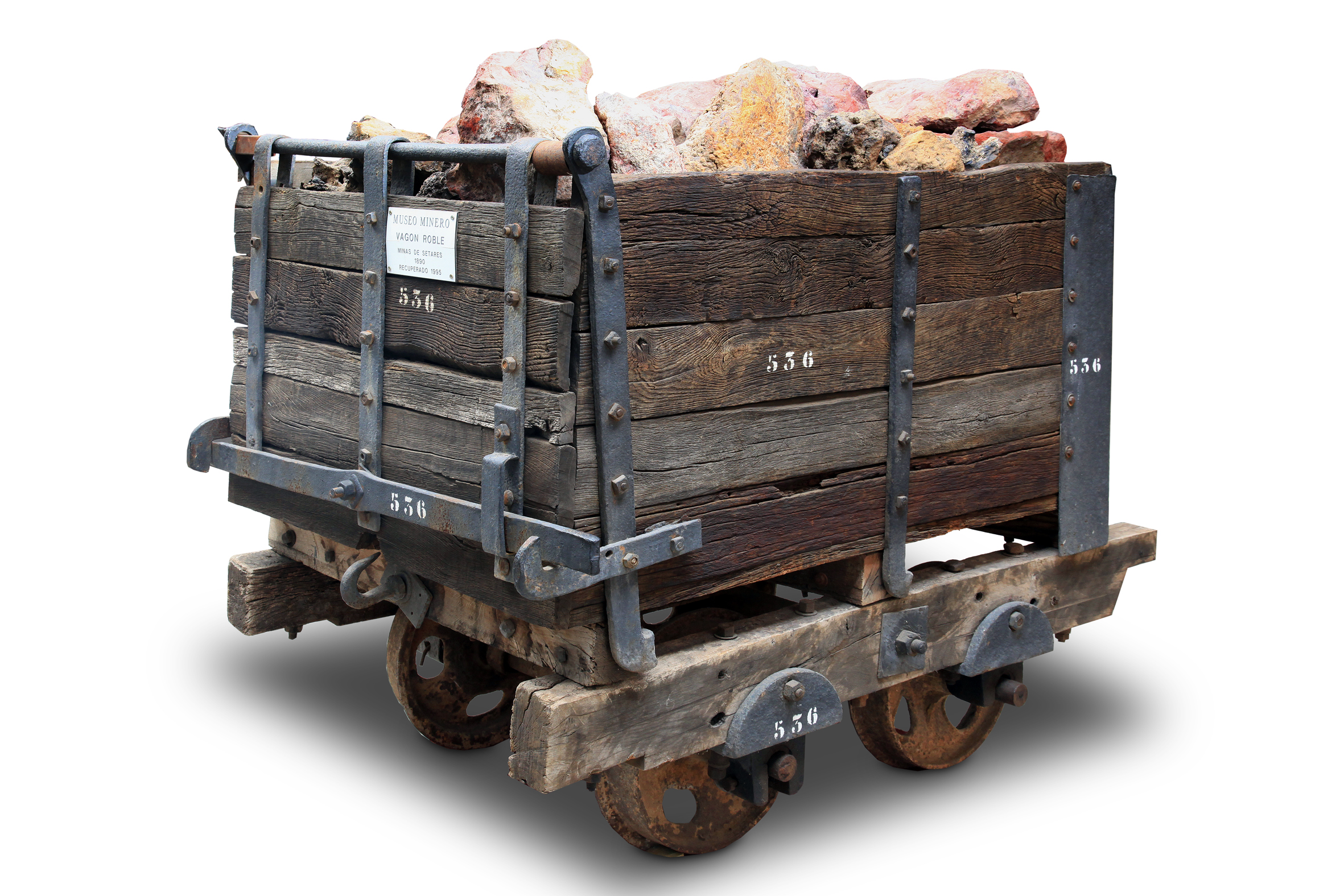
A dumper minecart used in the Basque Country, currently at the Minery Museum

A minecart, mine cart, or mine car (or more rarely mine trolley or mine hutch), is a type of rolling stock found on a mine railway, used for transporting ore and materials procured in the process of traditional mining. Minecarts are seldom used in modern operations, having largely been superseded in underground operations (especially coal mines) by more efficient belt conveyor systems that allow machines such as longwall shearers and continuous miners to operate at their full capacity, and above ground by large dumpers.

== Terminology ==
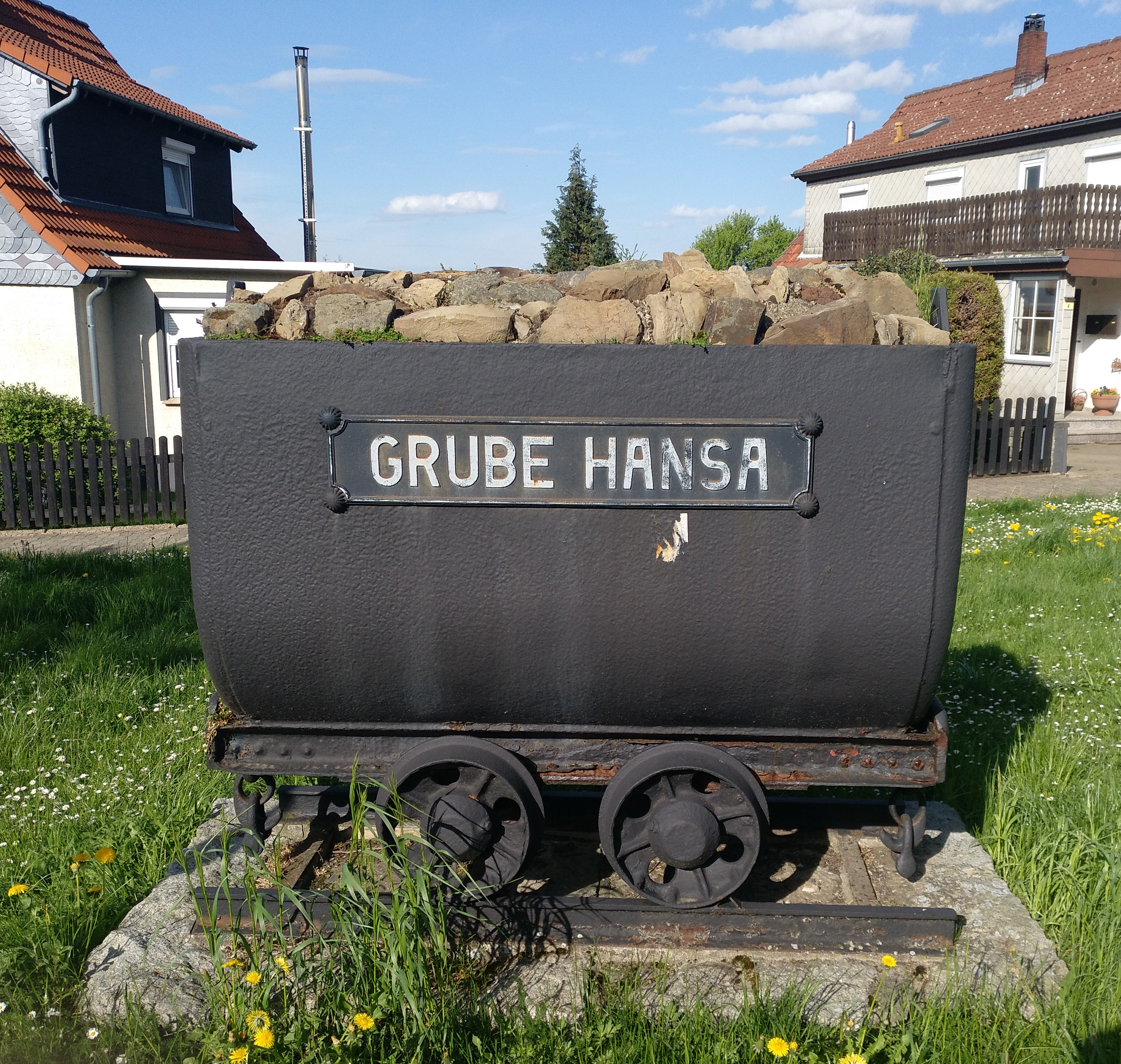
A Hunt at the Hansa Pit, Göttingerode, Germany

Throughout the world, there are different titles for mine carts. In South Africa, a minecart is referred to as a cocopan; or koekepan. In German, it is called Hunt (alternative spelling Hund). In Wales, minecarts are known as drams. In the U.S. and elsewhere, the term skip – or skip wagon (older spelling: waggon) – is used. (See: Skip (container) § Etymology)

In particular, a V skip wagon is a side-tipping skid with a V-shaped body (Images)

== Shape and operation ==
Minecarts range in size and usage, and are usually made of steel for hauling ore. Shaped like large, rectangular buckets, minecarts ride on metal tracks and were originally pushed or pulled by men and animals (supplemented later by rope-haulage systems). They were generally introduced in early modern time, replacing containers carried by men. Originally, they didn't run on a real "rail", where the wheels would have a rim to fit into the tracks, but with plain wheels on a wooden plank way, held on track by a pin fitting into a guide groove, or by the underside of the cart itself which was lower than the wheels and fitted between the planks ("Hungarian system").

As mines increased in size and output, the aforementioned methods became impractical because of the distances and quantities of material involved, so larger carts would be used, hauled by narrow gauge diesel and electric locomotives (in coal mining operations, where gas that is flammable would present a problem, the locomotives would be flameproof or battery powered). These were also used to pull trains transporting miners to the workfaces.

Minecarts were very important in the history of technology because they evolved into railroad cars. See History of rail transport.

=== Lorry or mine car ===
An open railroad car (gondola) with a tipping trough, often found in mines. Known in the UK as a tippler or chaldron wagon and in the US as a mine car.

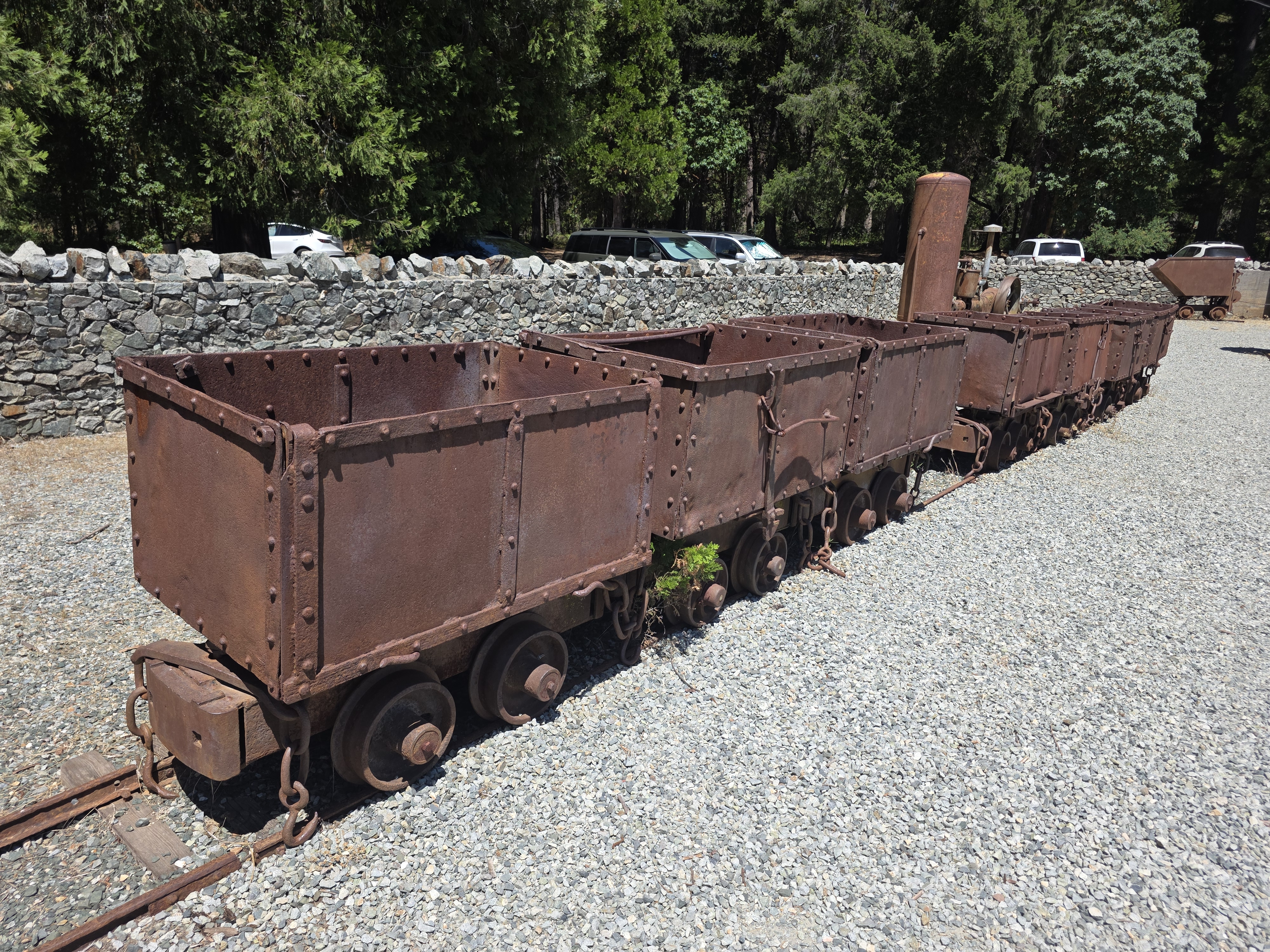
Gold mining carts at the Empire Mine State Historic Park in Grass Valley, California

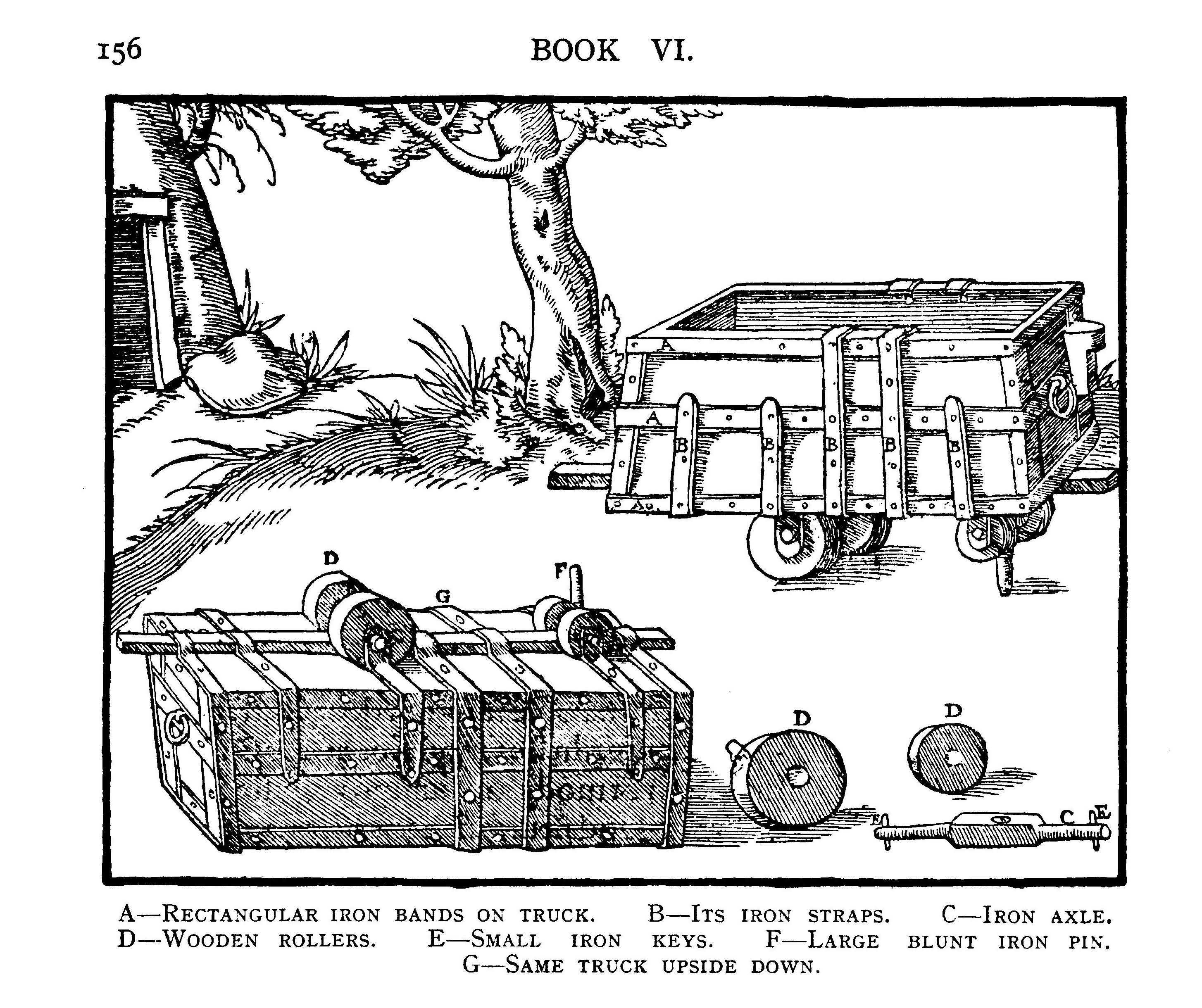
Mining cart shown in De Re Metallica (1556). The guide pin fits in a groove between two wooden planks.

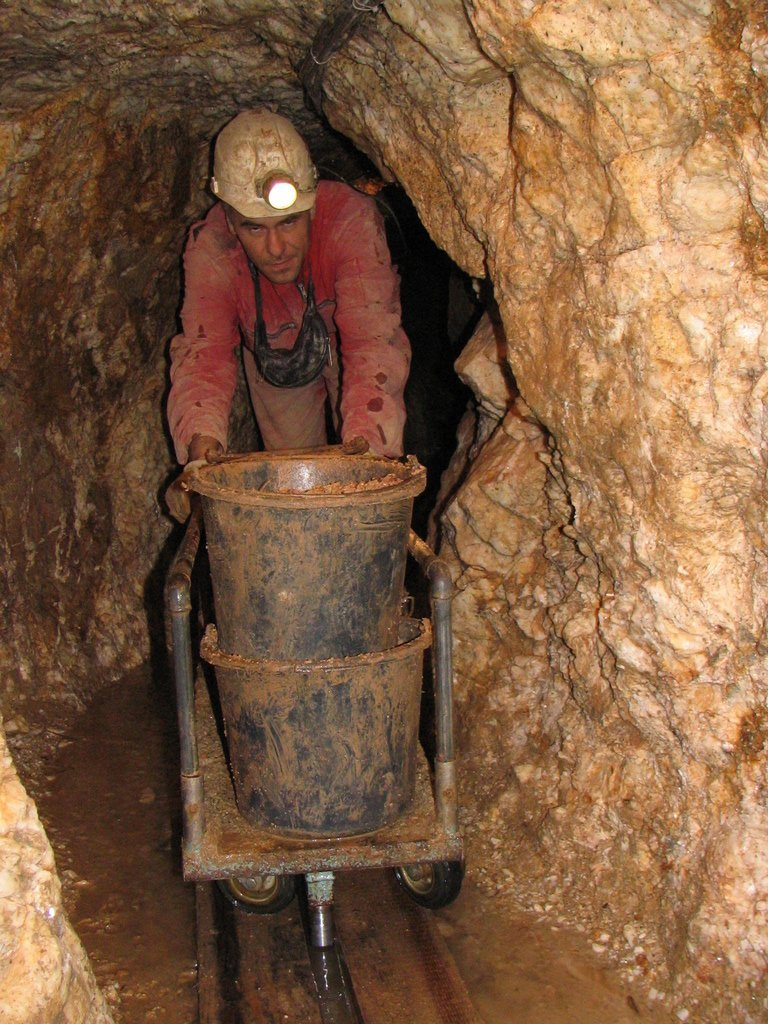
Note clearly visible guide pin.

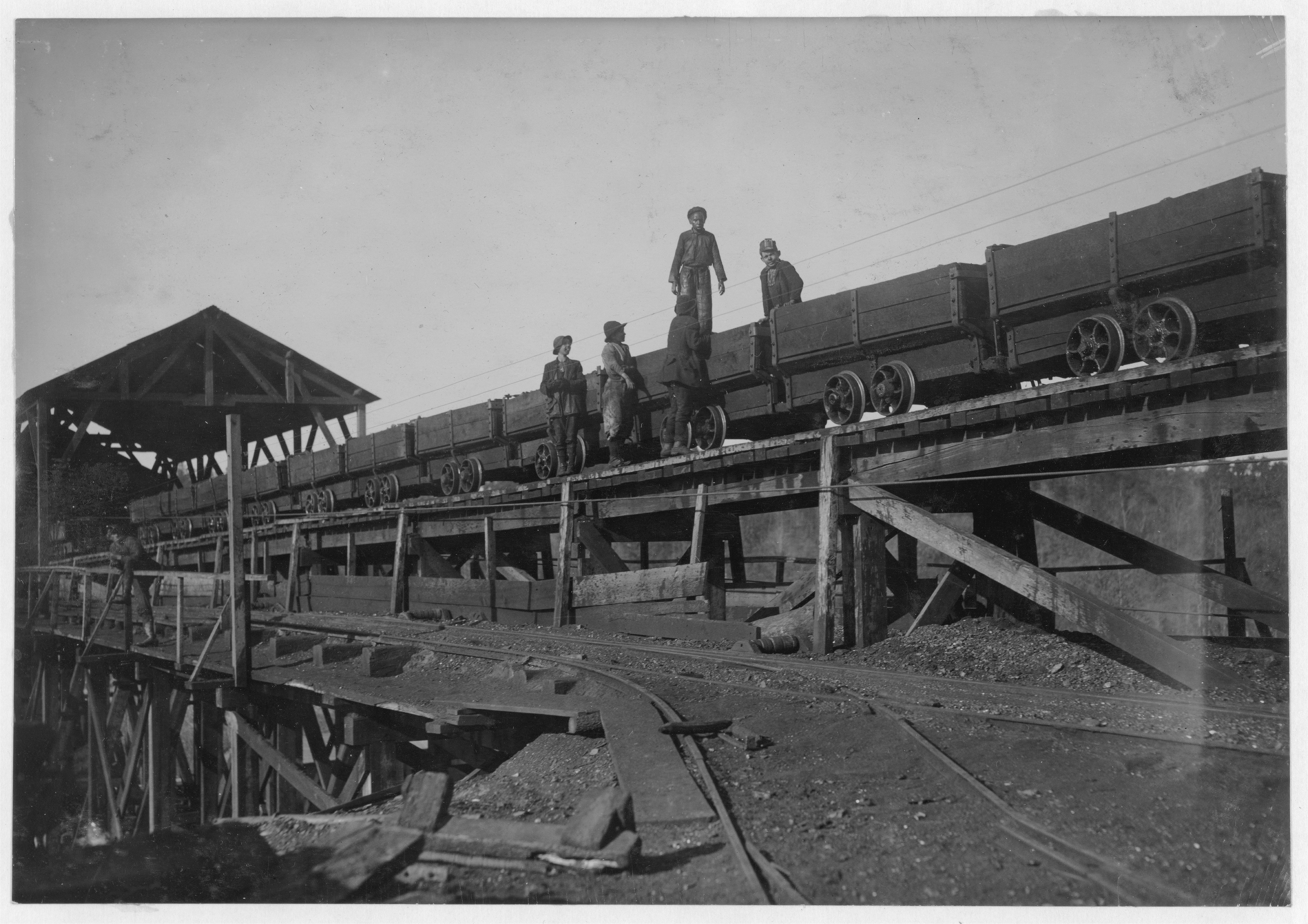
Child laborers on a minecart at Bessie Mine, Alabama, c. 1910-1911. Photo by Lewis Hine.

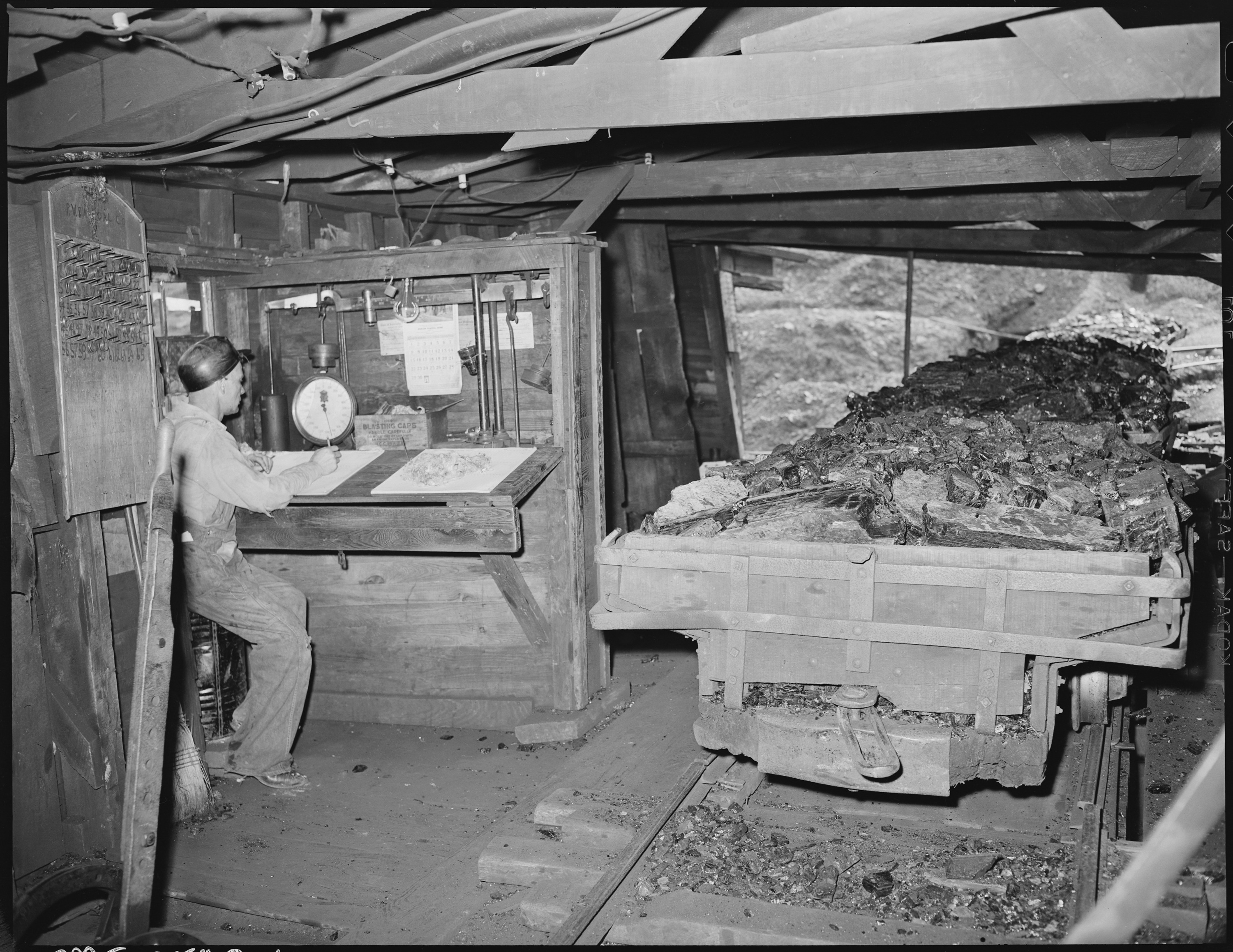
A mine car is weighed in a Kentucky coal tipple in 1946, before the coal is dumped into a railroad car.

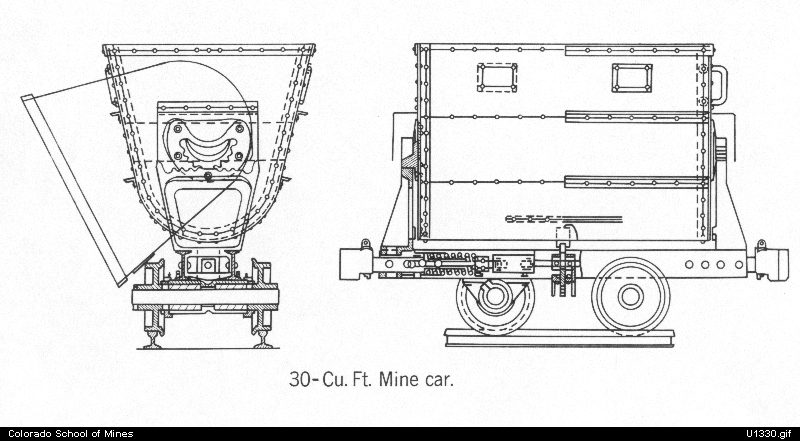
A 30 cu ft (0.85 m^{3}) mine car, drawing from the United States Bureau of Mines

== In popular culture ==
Minecarts have been depicted as a type of thrill ride; for instance Indiana Jones uses one in an escape scene in Indiana Jones and the Temple of Doom.

Mine train roller coasters are inspired by minecarts.

Minecart levels, a term used for levels in which the player takes a high-speed ride in a minecart, are common in video games, especially side-scrolling video games such as Donkey Kong Country and Fantastic Dizzy.

A minecart is also featured in two scenes of the 2005 animated film Hoodwinked!.

Minecarts and tracks can be crafted by the player in Minecraft and used for transportation. They are also found in abandoned mineshafts that generate naturally as a part of the game's procedural generation. In the 2025 film adaptation A Minecraft Movie features a scene where Steve and Garrett (portrayed by Jack Black and Jason Momoa) escape the mobs through a minecart.

Similarly to Minecraft, minecarts in Stardew Valley are also used for transportation between the farm, mines and a few other destinations but are not available from the beginning and are unlocked by completing one part of the community center.

In Sun Haven, a minecart is used for players to traverse between floors in the mines while other farm sims use lifts.

In Great Britain, restored mine carts (known as "tubs") containing floral displays can commonly be seen on village greens and outside pubs in former coal mining areas such as Northumberland and County Durham.

Like in Great Britain, old mine carts are common decorations in Germany, sometimes accompanied by old mining tools. Especially in the Ruhr Area those carts can be found in many front yards.

== See also ==
- Chaldron
- Corf
- Decauville wagon
- Gondola (rail)
- Mineral wagon
