= Corf =

Container used to contain live fish or crustaceans underwater

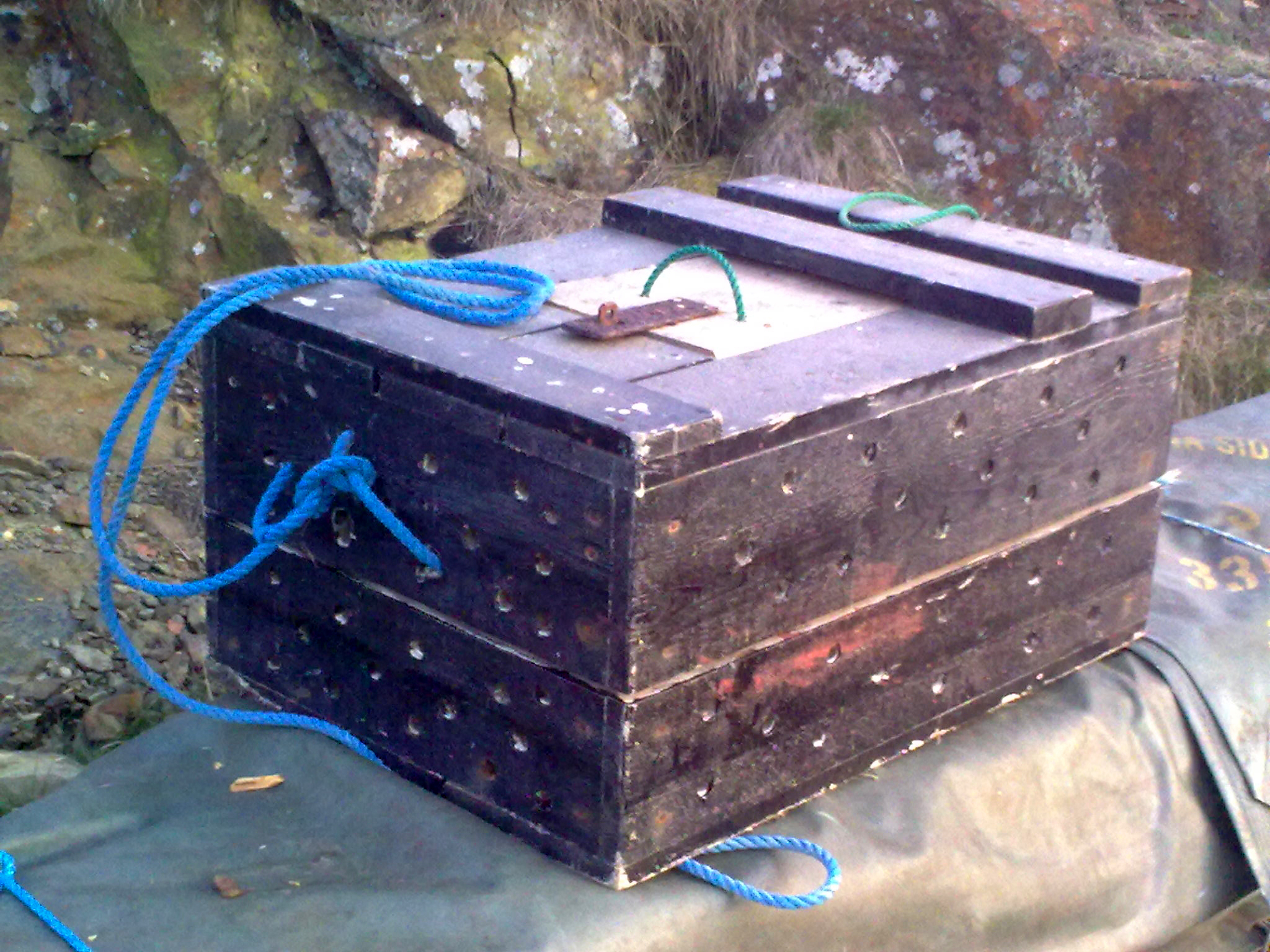
A wooden corf

A corf (pl. corves) also spelt corve (pl. corves) is a container of wood, net, chicken wire, metal or plastic used to contain live fish, eels or crustaceans (such as crayfish) underwater, at docks or in fishing boats.

== Origin of term ==
1350–1400; Middle English from Dutch and German Korb, ultimately borrowed from Latin corbis basket; cf. corbeil

== History ==
Corves were originally crucial to keep captured fish fresh until the boat with the catch reached its harbor. A corf could be towed behind the boat while fishermen made the journey from the fishing grounds to the fish market. These journeys could last up to half a day. When used for storing eels in Blekinge, Sweden, the corves could be as large as 3.75 by 1.33 by 0.8 m (12 ft 3 5/8 in by 4 ft 4 3/8 in by 2 ft 7 1/2 in) and contain about 2 metric tons (2.2 short tons; 2.0 long tons) of eels. They would be anchored approximately 100 m (330 ft) from land in an area where the water circulation was good to keep the eels alive. Smaller corves were often used in fishing boats to keep live bait for longline fishing.

The corf could also be built into the boat, and sometimes be a significant part of it. Fishing boats with a well amidships where water is circulated through small holes in the hull are known as well smacks.

In present days corves used for this purpose have commonly been replaced by refrigeration and freezing.

== Building ==
A corf-house is a small building or shed constructed for commercial curing of fish, mostly salmon, in. It is also used to store nets and fishing equipment in. One such house is the listed By Lovat Bridge Corf House in Beauly, Scotland.

== Modern use ==
Corves are mainly used by recreational fishermen and mass-produced in plastic netting or metal. Their use is regulated through laws and regulations in some countries such as Sweden, and Australia.

Modern fishing boats often have integral corves. These are built into the boat and the water in them kept fresh and oxygenated through a circulatory system with water and air pumps. This kind of corf is called a livewell.

== See also ==
- Fish farming
- Live fish trade
- Livewell
- Stew pond
- Well smack
