= Mineral wagon =

Small open-topped railway goods wagon

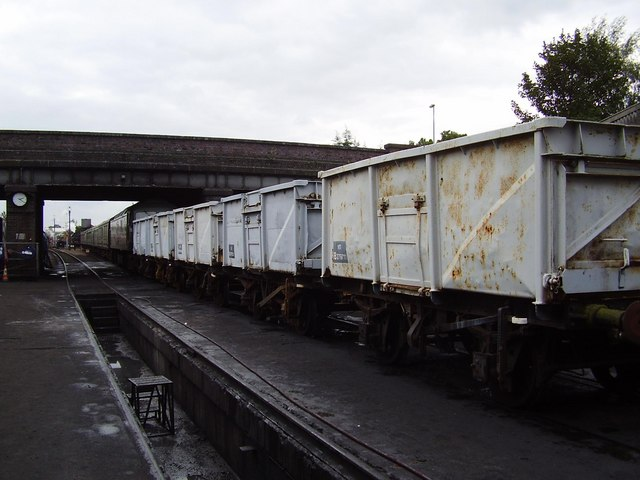
Some ex windcutter wagons at Loughborough MPD on the Great Central Railway

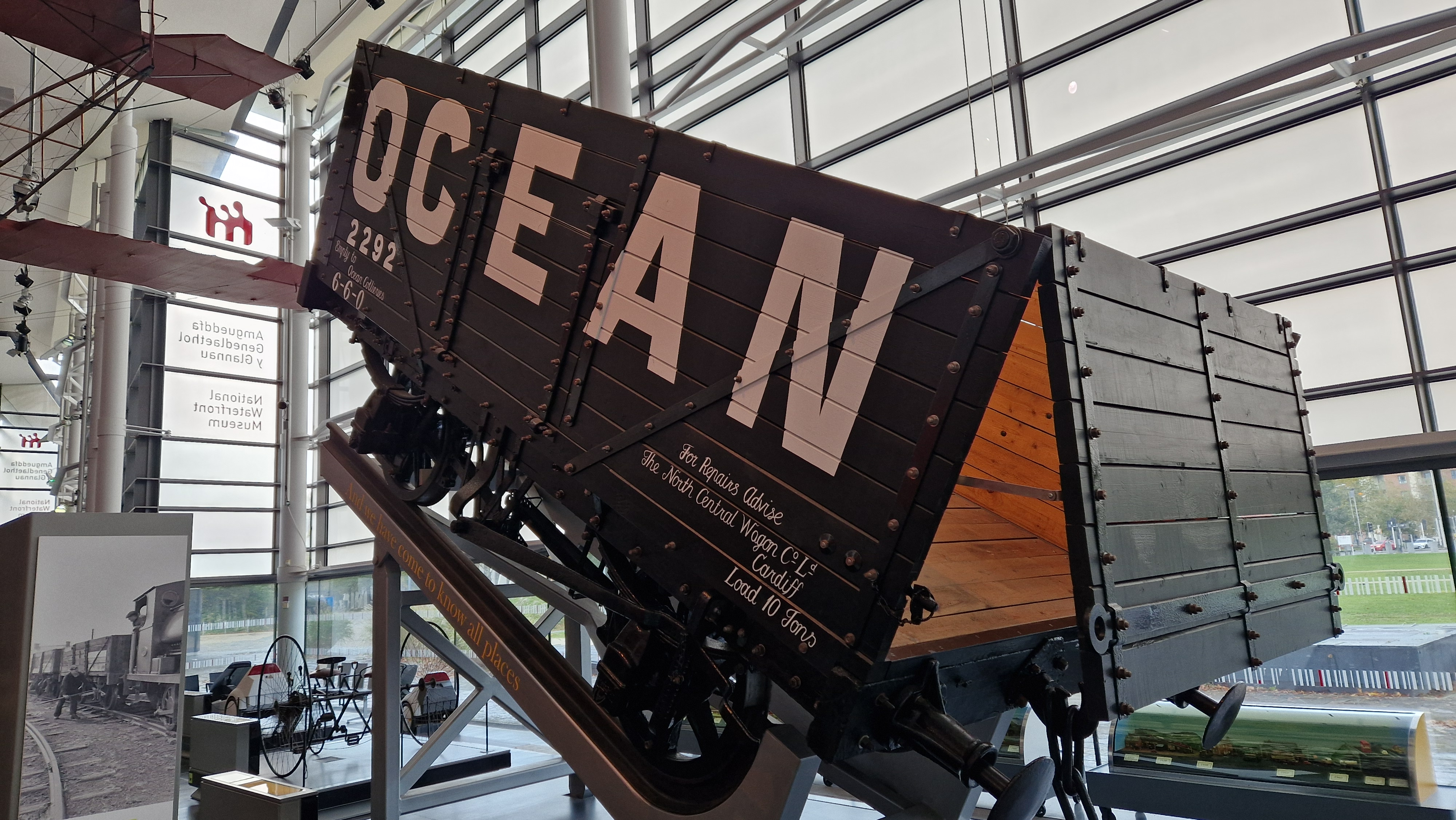
Mineral wagon at the National Waterfront Museum Swansea

A mineral wagon or coal truck (British English) is a small open-topped railway goods wagon used in the United Kingdom and elsewhere to carry coal, ores and other mine products.

== Background ==
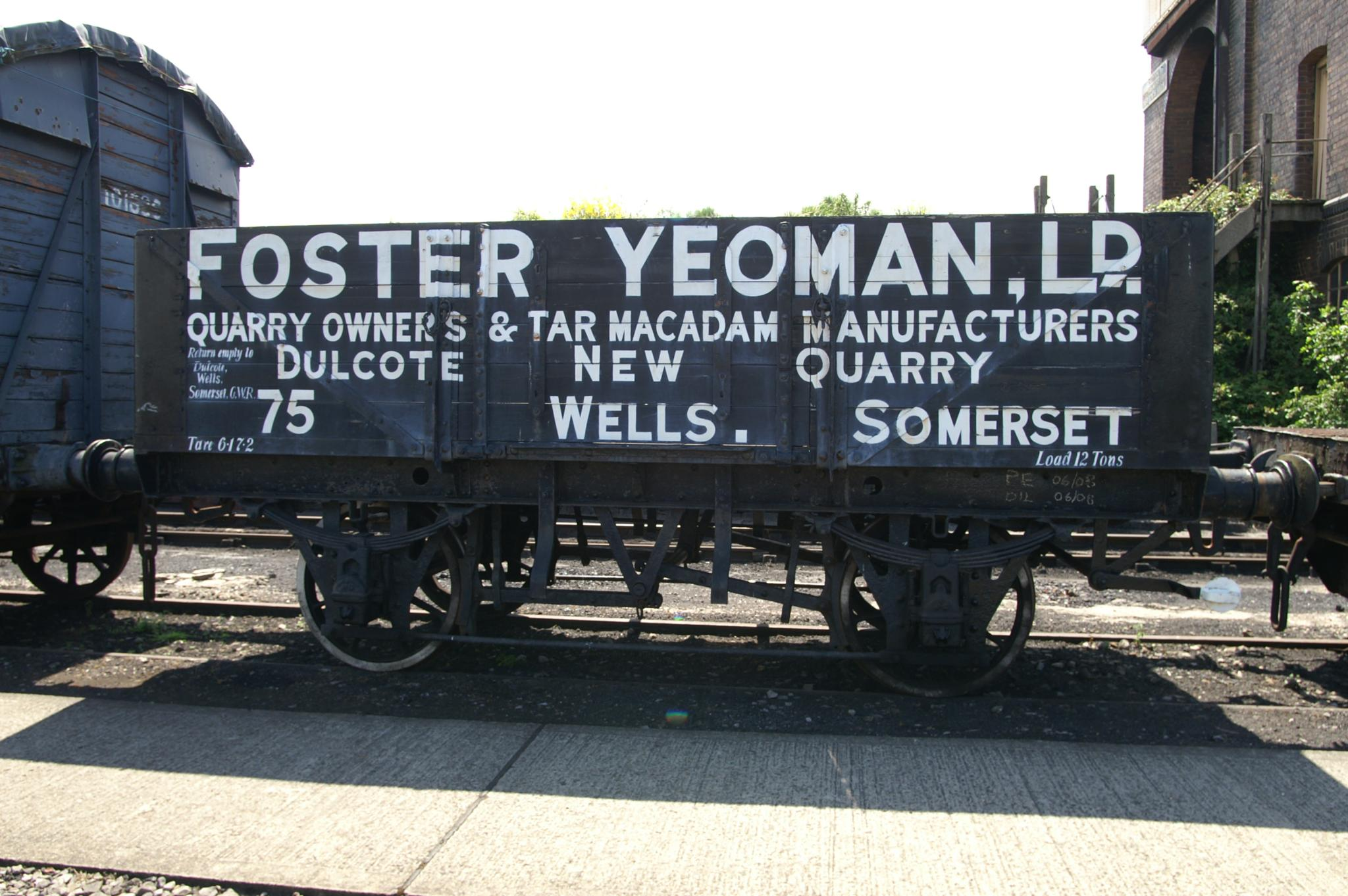
A preserved 6-plank wagon of the Foster Yeoman company at Didcot Railway Centre

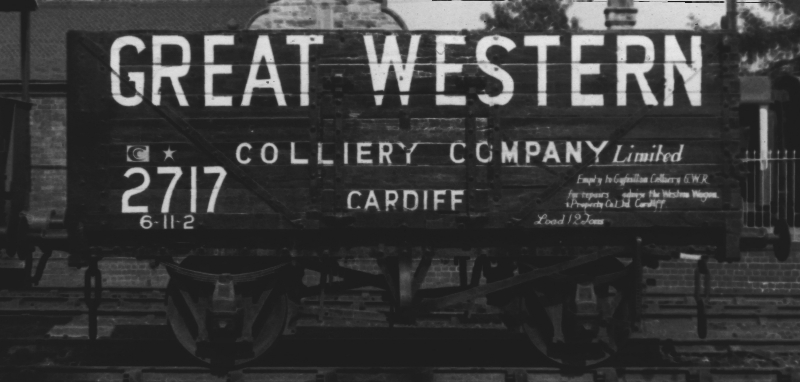
Great Western Colliery Company coal wagon

When the railways originated in the United Kingdom, the initial rules and laws of passage were based on those used on the roads. Hence the railway companies provided the track (road) and initially it was proposed that the owner of the goods being transported would either provide and operate their own train (locomotive and wagons) or obtain the services of an agent to do so. This 'open access' model quickly proved impractical so the emerging railway industry settled on a compromise of the railway company providing the route and locomotive and being responsible for their organisation and control, while the wagons and vans that transported the actual cargo remained in private hands.

As a step further towards the old open access arrangements some of the early long-distance railways contracted with a single transport agent to handle all their goods operations, with the agent not only providing wagons and vans but warehousing and handling at each station and conveying the goods to and from the railway at each end of the journey. For instance the London and North Western Railway contracted with Pickfords to manage all its goods operations on the line between London and Birmingham from 1841 to 1849.

This situation resulted in a proliferation of private owner wagons, and growth in wagon makers. But with few rules except those demanded by the railway companies (there was no Railway Inspectorate), wagons were mostly specified by agreement between the wagon manufacturer and the transporting customer. The original goods wagons – with many designs based on farm carts, and hence utilising four wheels – were based on an iron or steel frame, with main bodywork made of wood. The wagons had no driver operated train brakes, but were equipped with independent hand-operated brakes, which could be pinned on steep hills.

The railway companies had no control over the maintenance or design of private owner wagons (many were very poorly maintained and crude in construction – and many of the 'private owners' actually leased their wagons from the wagon builder, adding a further layer of complexity to maintaining the vehicles) but were legally obliged to operate them. This led to frequent delays and breakdowns due to broken couplings, faulty brakes and hot boxes – the latter caused by the crude grease-lubricated wheel bearings often used on private owner wagons – and problems caused by the simple dumb buffers that were near-universally used up to the time of World War I.

To combat these issues the Railway Clearing House (an organisation originally set up to share out revenue from joint services between companies) introduced minimum standards for private owner wagons in 1887. Companies that were signed up to the RCH refused to allow wagons that did not meet the standards in their trains, although there was a long grace period for owners to upgrade or replace their older wagons. The operational advantages of the more reliable and modern RCH design were such that several railway companies instigated 'buy-back' schemes for private-owner wagons, whereby the company would buy existing wagons from their owners. Either the railway replaced them with company-owned wagons or the private owner spent their proceeds on new RCH-type wagons.

Between 1882 and 1902 the Midland Railway purchased 66,000 private-owner wagons and built over 50,000 of its own wagons as replacements. New and stricter standards were introduced by the RCH in 1909 which required hydraulic buffers and oil-lubricated bearings as well as numerous other details in the construction of the frame, brakes, axles, and suspension that made the RCH's design the basis for virtually every British mineral and goods wagon for the next 30 years. Wagons that complied with the standards carried a plate saying 'RCH'. Although the 1909 design standards were supposed to be fully enforced by 1914 the advent of World War I meant that they were suspended and many non-compliant wagons actually remained in service until well after the Grouping of 1921.

The result was a cheap, sturdy wagon which was easily repaired when damaged, but they proved relatively short-lived and hence increasingly uneconomic.

== Development ==
With wooden bodied wagons proving uneconomic to replace for their owners, and post the 1930s recession the wagon makers looking for more economic longer-life products, both Charles Roberts and Company and the Butterley Company started developing standard all-steel construction mineral wagons, with capacities of 14 long tons (14.2 t; 15.7 short tons) and 15 long tons (15.2 t; 16.8 short tons). those from Roberts had sloping sides, and both companies a combination of riveted or welded construction.

At the outbreak of World War II and with need for a quick expansion in railway carrying capacity, the then Ministry of Transport (MoT) requisitioned all of the existing steel wagons from both companies, including the stock within the private mineral companies that they had sold them to; and also placed additional orders with both companies. The MoT then developed a specification for a standard 16-long-ton (16.3 t; 17.9-short-ton) wagon:

- 2 axles/4 wheels
- 9 feet (2.74 m) wheel base
- 16 feet 6 inches (5.03 m) total length over headstocks
- 2 side doors, 1 end door, and optional 2 bottom trap doors. These latter necessitated double, independent brakes either side.
- Only equipped with the standard Morton "V" hanger independent hand-brakes

Contracting out the orders to both existing wagon companies as well as general engineering contractors, the result was a huge variance in constructions methodologies (welded/riveted), and some minor design differences (fabricated/pressed steel doors;).

Despite the introduction of the all-steel wagons the basic structure for standard mineral wagons remained largely the same as those from the earliest days of the railways – short in wheelbase, relatively low in capacity, restricted to low speeds and mostly without a form of continuous braking. This reliance on a large number of small, simple wagons introduced a great deal of inefficiency to railway operations. Railway companies had long wanted to adopt larger-capacity mineral stock with braking and running gear suited to operating at higher speeds, but the introduction of improved stock was always stopped by opposition from the railways' biggest customers – collieries, ports and heavy industry.

These industries had sidings and loading/unloading equipment designed around the short-wheelbase, rectangular, sheer-sided and unbraked wagon which had been in use for nearly a century. Operations at both the colliery and the user end was dependent on loading/unloading wagons individually and the need to connect and disconnect brake systems or handle a wagon perhaps twice the size and weight of the familiar type was seen as a huge disruption. Some industries could not even accept braked variants of the standard all-steel mineral wagon as the work-side track or handling equipment would foul the brake gear.

In the era of private-owner wagons, the railways had little power to enforce such a major change on their customers as the customers owned the wagons the railway was paid to transport. The North Eastern Railway leveraged its geographic monopoly over a large coal-producing area to encourage major collieries in its territory to accept the NER's own design of 20-ton wooden-bodied coal hopper. Other railways offered financial incentives such as lower carriage rates for larger or more modern wagon types but the take-up remained very limited. The NER's successor, the London and North Eastern Railway introduced 21-ton steel-bodied hoppers for mineral work and that design was continued by British Railways but the vast majority of British coal was still transported in the 16-ton, 9-foot wheelbase steel wagon.

The situation was in a deadlock as the industries refused to adapt to use different stock while the traditional mineral wagon remained in widespread use, while the railways had to continue use of the wagon as it was the transport method favoured by its biggest source of freight traffic. It wasn't until the 1960s that Merry-go-round trains changed a system for transporting coal that was fundamentally different from that introduced in the 1830s, with specially designed hoppers that could carry twice the load at twice the speed of the old mineral wagon.

== Variants ==
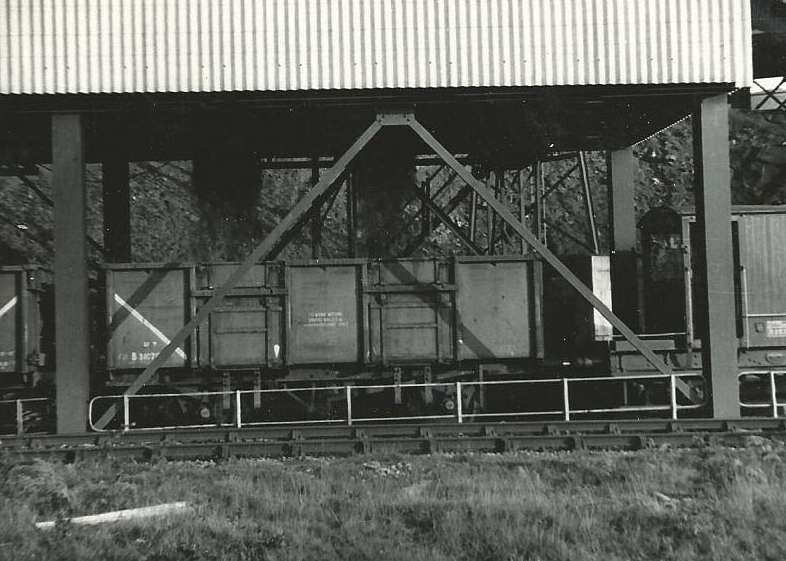
Vacuum-braked 21 ton coal wagon being loaded from a hopper at Blaenant Colliery, bound for Aberthaw Power Station, 1965

The basic wagon had numerous variants.

On creation of British Railways (BR) in 1948 – which took control of all railway assets, including all private owner wagons – the new organisation inherited 55,000 original MoT wagons, they were all given a "B" prefix in their 5-figure numbering. Both the LNER and London, Midland and Scottish Railway (LMS) had taken an additional 5,000 wagons from the MoT post-WW2, and once these were absorbed by BR were given the prefix "M".

Due to the decimated state of Europe after World War II, SNCF in France ordered 10,000 MoT specification wagons – except for their continental-style vertically hinged "cupboard" doors – from various British-based wagon manufacturers in 1945/1946. Proving quickly out-dated due to their small capacity, BR bought the residual 9,000 in 1951. Overhauled by their original manufacturers, they were subsequently given numbers in the "B19xxxx"-series. All were withdrawn by the end of the 1960s.

The basic BR-commissioned variant copied the MoT original specification, using either welded (diagram 1/108; 85% were made to this diagram), or riveted body construction (diagram 1/109; only 10% of the total number of wagons). The main change with the new BR specification was to introduce linked Morton vacuum brakes. As these mineral wagons were "fitted" with brakes, unlike their "unfitted" predecessors, they were known as "Minfits". The most common variant was an opening flap above both of the side doors. Known as a "London Traders" flap, there are conflicting ideas about its function, but it is generally thought to have been provided to make it easier for coal merchants to unload the wagon by hand.

BR through various large orders eventually brought the total number of wagons to over 300,000. This included a late-1950s order towards the end of their construction, when Pressed Steel was commissioned to build 27,500 wagons split across 4 lot numbers.

Re-bodying occurred throughout the wagon's service with BR, until the end of their service in the late 1970s. This mainly resulted in a replacement steel body without top doors. But in 1975 under lot number 3863, 394 former Palbrick wagons with a length of 17 ft 6 in (5.33 m) over headstocks and 10-foot (3.05 m) wheelbase chassis were re-bodied, and then renumbered "B596000 - B596393". BR eventually developed a 21 long tons (23.5 short tons; 21.3 t) version (B200000-B202499 series), which was a 16T wagon with extended wheel base and two side doors.

Under TOPS, the remaining wagons were allocated codes MCO and MCV for those with clasp brakes (two shoes per wheel), and from 1981 code MXV for those with push brakes (one shoe per wheel).

== Operations ==
In the era of private-owner wagons the movement of mineral wagons could be complex as coal was moved around the British rail network to wherever it was needed. Different users required (or preferred) different grades of coal, and not all the coalfields of the United Kingdom produced all the grades. Even areas with large-scale mining activity could also receive coal from other areas of the country, and there was also a large export market – around a quarter of coal mined in Britain was sent abroad. Users ranged from large heavy industry and power generation sites to a single coal merchant selling coal for domestic users in a single rural village.

In the major coal mining areas, the large collieries (or companies that owned multiple collieries) would privately own several hundred mineral wagons. In South Wales, where large quantities of coal were shipped directly to docks such as Cardiff and Barry, trains consisting of long rakes of colliery-owned wagons (sometimes even with one train consisting entirely of wagons from a single owner) ran between the coal mines and the docks. Coal mines might also deal directly with large customers buying coal in bulk. While such orders would commonly be shipped from the colliery to the customer in colliery wagons, some users had their own fleets of mineral wagons to collect coal from whichever colliery was supplying. There were also businesses acting as coal factors of various sizes, buying coal from collieries and selling it to users. Again, some factors maintained their own fleet of mineral wagons to both collect and deliver coal, others received coal in colliery-owned wagons and distributed it in their own and some merely acted as intermediaries, arranging for the shipment to be delivered either in the colliery wagons or with wagons supplied by the customer, the railway or from a wagon hirer.

Britain had thousands of coal merchants, all but the largest of which purchased coal from factors and then sold it to the end user which was usually smaller businesses and domestic customers. While large cities may have supported several large coal merchants operating from multiple sites, most were small enterprises serving their immediate local area. Merchants would receive coal in the goods yard of their local railway station. Some merchants rented yard space from the railway to store, sell and distribute coal but others had their premises elsewhere, unloading their coal direct from the wagon to a cart for transport to its final destination.

While the collieries and large coal factors could ship hundreds of wagons of coal per day, a local merchant serving a rural village may only receive one wagon per week. Some merchants operated their own wagons, since this avoided fees for using the wagon and meant only paying the railway for the use of the siding while the wagon was occupying it. Smaller retailers usually received coal in wagons owned by the colliery or coal factor, which also avoided wagon charges payable to the railway company. Many of these private 'owner' wagons were actually leased – wagon builders often arranged lease and maintenance deals with customers, and other firms specialised in the lease and hire of wagons. The wagons of even small local merchants could sometimes range widely over the railway system depending on where the owner had sourced his next shipment of coal. Coal was by far the largest single traffic on the British network, with trains of mineral wagons being assembled, moved, split up, reassembled and broken down again as coal moved around the country between the source, the intermediary buyer(s) and the end customer.

Mineral wagons fitted with continuous brake gear (which could be controlled by the driver on the locomotive) were virtually unheard of prior to the 1930s. Mineral wagons were therefore classed as 'unfitted', since their only brakes were a handbrake applied and released manually from the trackside. The only braking system therefore available to mineral trains consisted of the steam brake on the locomotive and the manually applied mechanical brake on the brake van at the rear. When descending steep gradients the train would be brought to a halt (or slow to a walking pace) and the crew would apply the handbrakes on enough of the wagons to keep the train under control. The train would then have to stop at the bottom of the gradient for these brakes to be released. The guard in the brake van would aim to operate his brake to maintain a slight drag on the train to keep the couplings between the wagons taught, but not so much drag as to cause unnecessary load on the locomotive or risk breaking a coupling.

Due to the lack of stopping power, and because coal was a low-value bulk good that did not lose value with time as it was transported, mineral trains travelled at low speeds – rarely more than 25 mph (40 km/h) and often significantly less. The basic design of the wagons, with two axles and a short fixed wheelbase plus the widespread use of wheel bearings lubricated by grease or tallow in the pre-1914 era, also discouraged travel at higher speeds. When smaller numbers of mineral wagons were required to travel to a location, they would often be added (with a brake van) to the tail of a freight train consisting of general goods wagons fitted with a continuous brake. The extra braking power and control allowed the train to travel at up to 35 mph (56 km/h). In the 1930s, the LNER began fitting a small portion of its steel-bodied wagons with vacuum brakes, so that a small number of these could be marshalled at the front of long trains of otherwise unfitted mineral wagons to increase the braking abilities and allow slightly faster running speeds.

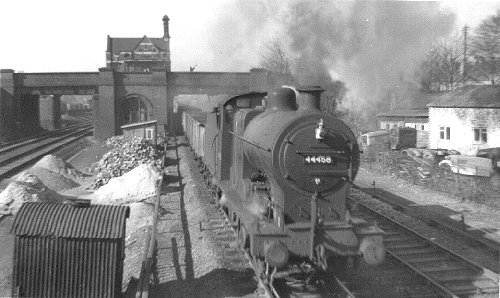
A Birmingham (Washwood Heath) empty wagon service, almost certainly destined for Toton in Nottinghamshire. Ex LMS Fowler 0-6-0 4F 44458 passing Water Orton Station Junction and on to the main lines to Kingsbury with a train of empty 16T mineral wagons

In BR days, there were unfitted mineral trains run at express freight speed, locally known as "the Annesley Cutters" or "Windcutters", exclusively running on the ex-GC line. These ran from Annesley, a collection yard for the collieries of Nottinghamshire served by the ex Great Central Railway, to Woodford Halse and then onwards to major destinations across southern England. These trains have been recreated on the preserved Great Central Railway, using over 30 of these wagons purchased in 1992 by readers of Steam Railway magazine. Whilst there were many equivalent empty wagon trains run by the Midland/ LMS/ BR LM Region, they were never run at express speeds, nor did they attract any nickname such as Windcutters.

=== Withdrawal ===
Mineral wagons were phased out by BR in the 1970s, following reduction in demand for household coal and the development of merry-go-round trains, which used much larger (and braked) hopper wagons. Two batches of 16-ton wagons were bought by CC Crump in 1971, hired to ICI in Runcorn for the transport of soda ash, and subsequently scrapped in 1979.

The rusty BR survivors were transferred to Departmental use, under TOPS codes ZHO (unfitted) and ZHV (vacuum braked). Used by civil engineers for general works, the greater weight of stone necessitated holes being cut in the wagon sides to avoid over-loading. According to TOPS records, 3,600 ZHVs were in use by 1987, 26 in 1992, and 4 by 1999.

== See also ==
- Chaldron
- Corf
- Decauville wagon
- Gondola
- Hopper car
- Minecart
- Open wagon
- Quarry tub
- Slate waggon
