= Corf (mining) =

Basket or small wagon used for carrying coal

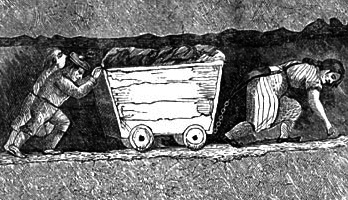
A hurrier and two thrusters heaving a corf full of coal as depicted in the 1853 book The White Slaves of England by J Cobden.

A corf (pl. corves) also spelt corve (pl. corves) in mining is a wicker basket or a small human powered (in later times in the case of the larger mines, horse drawn) minecart for carrying or transporting coal, ore, etc. Human powered corfs had generally been phased out by the turn of the 20th century, with horse drawn corfs having been mostly replaced by horse drawn or motorised minecarts mounted on rails by the late 1920s. Also similar is a Tram, originally a box on runners, dragged like a sledge.

== Origin of term ==
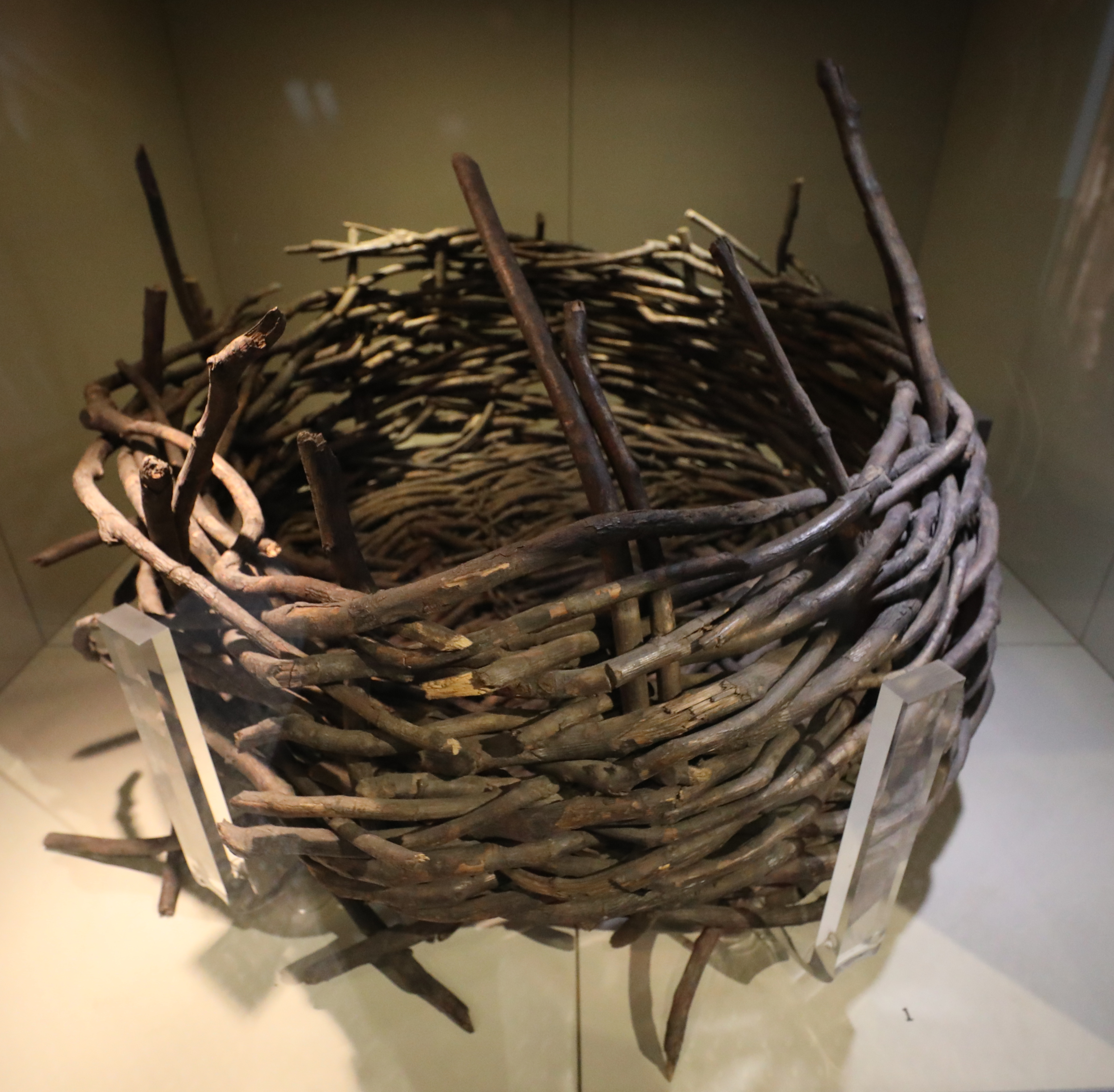
A basket style corf held at the National Coal Mining Museum for England

1350–1400; Middle English from Dutch and German Korb, ultimately borrowed from Latin corbis basket; cf. corbeil.

== Survivors ==
The National Coal Mining Museum for England has a hazel basket type Corf from William Pit near Whitehaven.

== See also ==
- Corf (fishing)
- Decauville wagon
- Minecart
- Mineral wagon
- Mines and Collieries Act 1842
