= Gebhardshain (Verbandsgemeinde) =

Coordinates: 50.746389°N 7.820833°E

Gebhardshain is a former Verbandsgemeinde ("collective municipality") in the district of Altenkirchen, in Rhineland-Palatinate, Germany. On 1 January 2017, it merged into the new Verbandsgemeinde Betzdorf-Gebhardshain. The seat of the Verbandsgemeinde was in Gebhardshain.

The Verbandsgemeinde Gebhardshain consisted of the following Ortsgemeinden ("local municipalities"):

1. Dickendorf
2. Elben
3. Elkenroth
4. Fensdorf
5. Gebhardshain
6. Kausen
7. Malberg
8. Molzhain
9. Nauroth
10. Rosenheim
11. Steinebach/Sieg
12. Steineroth
