= Betzdorf (Verbandsgemeinde) =

Verbandsgemeinde in Rhineland-Palatinate

Coordinates: 50.786°N 7.873°E

Betzdorf is a former Verbandsgemeinde ("collective municipality") in the district of Altenkirchen, in Rhineland-Palatinate, Germany. On 1 January 2017 it merged into the new Verbandsgemeinde Betzdorf-Gebhardshain. The seat of the Verbandsgemeinde was in Betzdorf.

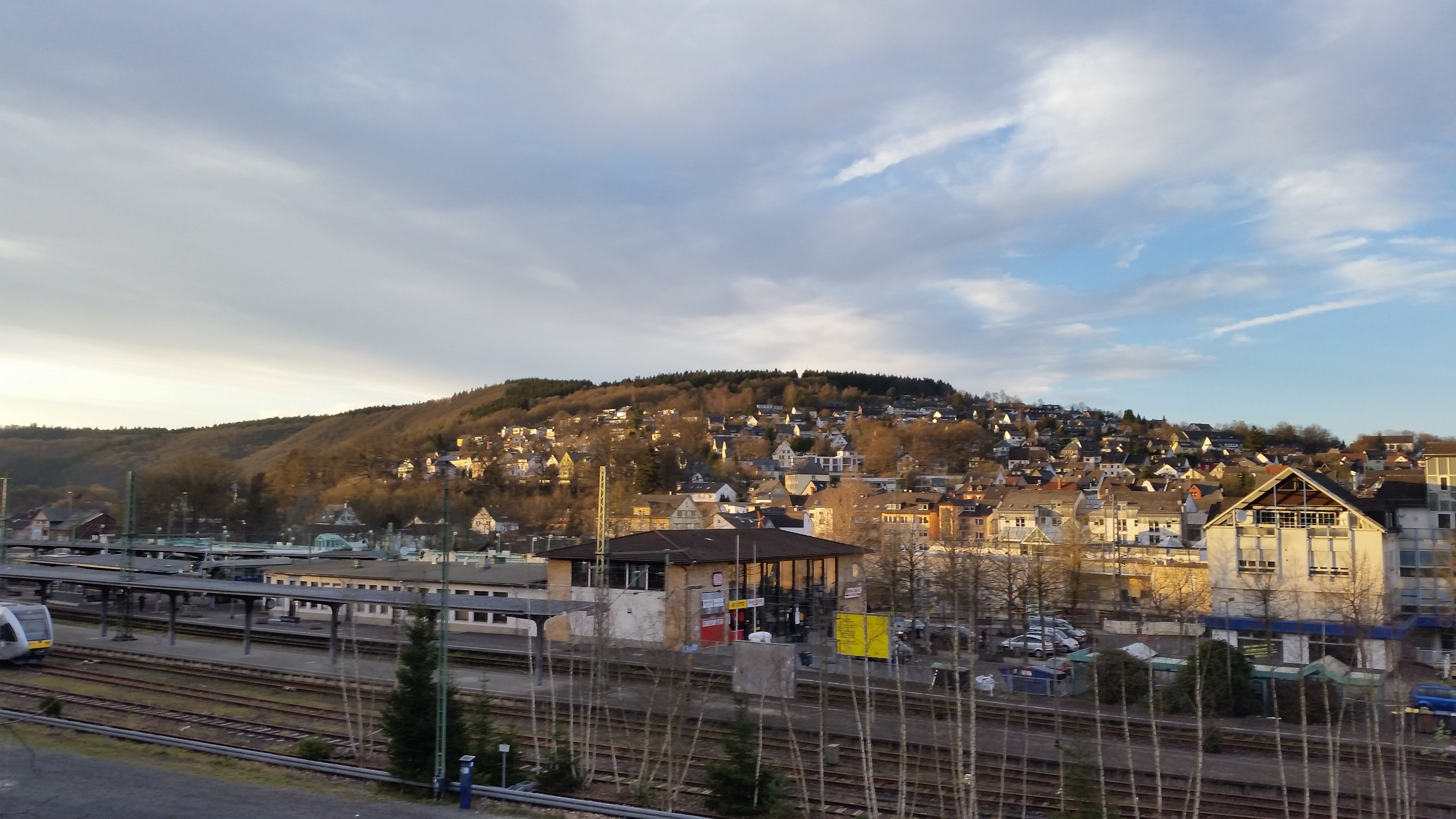

The Verbandsgemeinde Betzdorf consisted of the following Ortsgemeinden ("local municipalities"):

Municipality	Area (km²)	Population
Alsdorf	5.93	1,513
Betzdorf	9.57	10,223
Grünebach	2.50	499
Scheuerfeld	2.66	2,110
Wallmenroth	3.85	1,208
Wissen	34.88	8,543
