= Betzdorf =

Betzdorf may refer to:

- Betzdorf, Luxembourg, a village and municipality in Luxembourg
- Betzdorf, Germany, a town and municipality in Rhineland-Palatinate
- Betzdorf (Verbandsgemeinde), a former collective municipality whose seat was Betzdorf, Germany
- SS Betzdorf, a number of ships with this name
