= Gebhardshain =

- Municipality
- Coat of arms

- Location of Gebhardshain within Altenkirchen district
- Interactive map of Gebhardshain
- Location within Germany Location within Rhineland-Palatinate
- Coordinates: 50°44′48″N 07°49′12″E
- Country: Germany
- State: Rhineland-Palatinate
- District: Altenkirchen
- Municipal assoc.: Betzdorf-Gebhardshain

Government
  - Mayor (2019–24): Jürgen Giehl (CDU)

Area
  - Total: 5.97 km^{2} (2.31 sq mi)
- Elevation: 385 m (1,263 ft)

Population (2025-12-31)
  - Total: 1,840
  - Density: 308/km^{2} (798/sq mi)
- Time zone: UTC+01:00 (CET)
  - Summer (DST): UTC+02:00 (CEST)
- Postal codes: 57580
- Dialling codes: 02747
- Vehicle registration: AK
- Website: www.gebhardshain.de

Gebhardshain is a municipality in the district of Altenkirchen, in Rhineland-Palatinate, Germany. It is situated in the Westerwald, approx. 20 km south-west of Siegen. Gebhardshain was the seat of the former Verbandsgemeinde ("collective municipality") Gebhardshain.

Gebhardshain was mentioned for the first time in the year 1220. Gebhardshain belonged at that time to the nobility of those from Gervertzhagen and was assigned to the territory of the count von Sayn.

In 1378, these recognized prince elector of Trier as their liege lord. Therefore, Gebhardshain belonged both to the diocese Trier and to the archbishop's secular barony.

Since 1990, there is a partnership with the municipality Kreuzebra.

== Transport ==
Gebhardshain located at the Westerwald railway, which is currently out of service. The local bus lines B268 and B269 serve the village. It's located on the area of the transport association Verkehrsverbund Rhein-Mosel (VRM).

== Energy ==
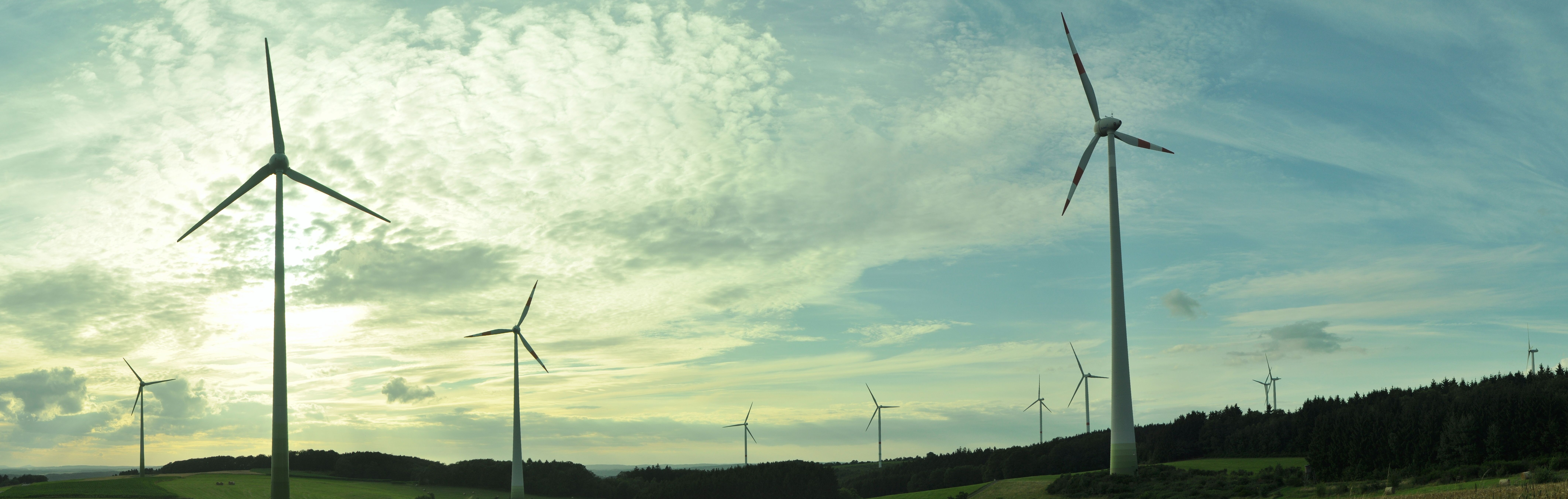
Gebhardshain wind park

A wind farm of 7 Nordex N90 wind turbines is located near the village.
