= Scheuerfeld =

- Municipality
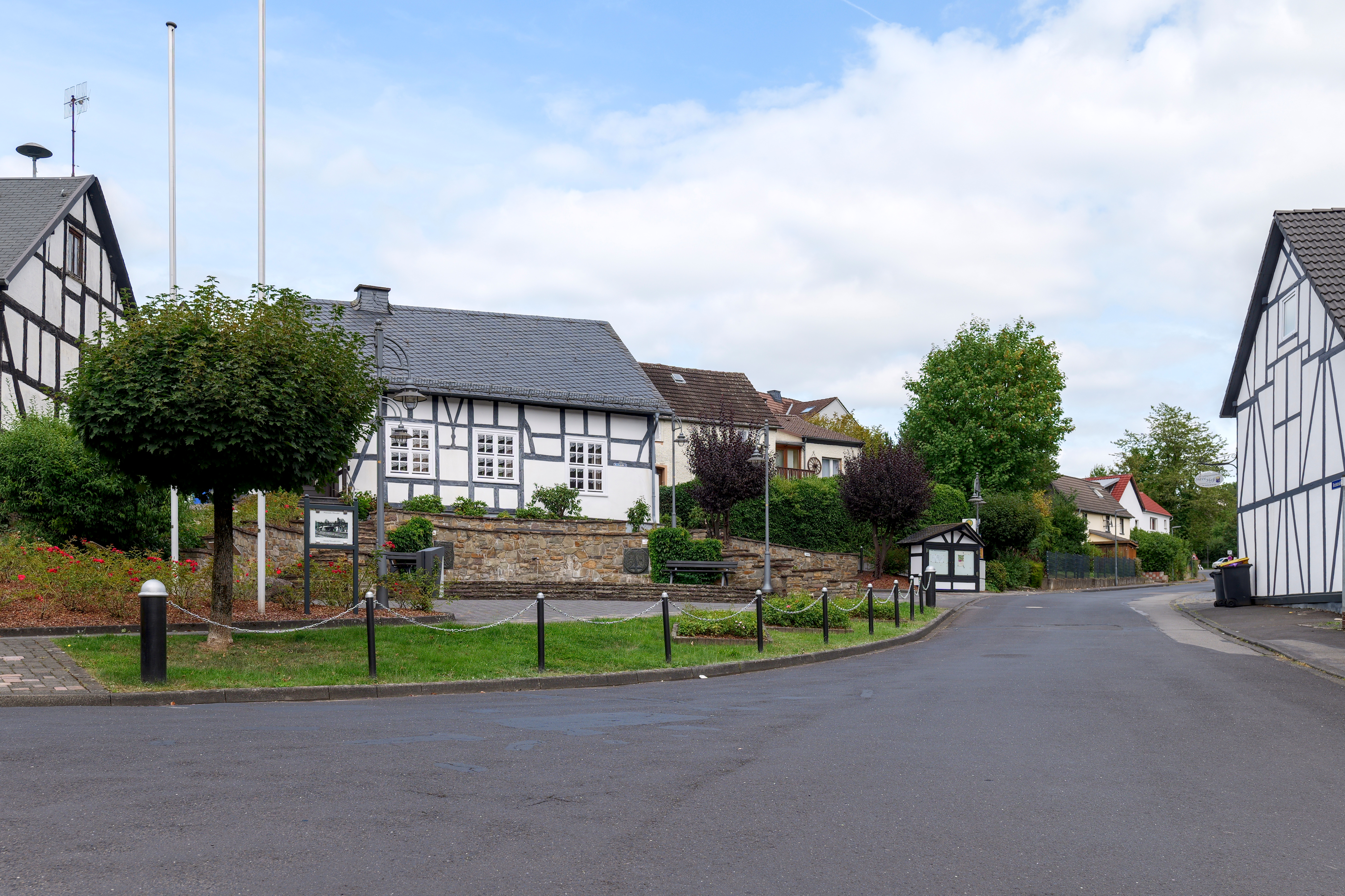

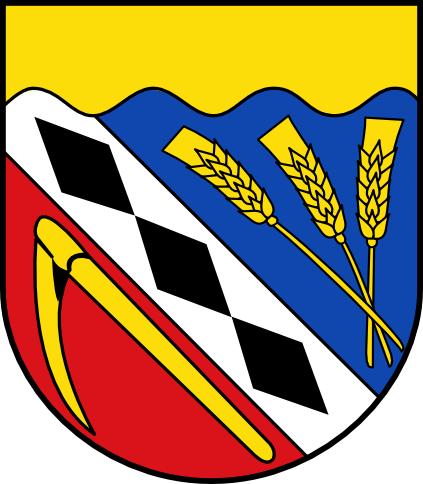
- Coat of arms

- Location of Scheuerfeld within Altenkirchen (Westerwald) district
- Interactive map of Scheuerfeld
- Location within Germany Location within Rhineland-Palatinate
- Coordinates: 50°47′14″N 7°50′25″E
- Country: Germany
- State: Rhineland-Palatinate
- District: Altenkirchen (Westerwald)
- Municipal assoc.: Betzdorf-Gebhardshain

Government
  - Mayor (2019–24): Harald Dohm (CDU)

Area
  - Total: 2.66 km^{2} (1.03 sq mi)
- Elevation: 216 m (709 ft)

Population (2025-12-31)
  - Total: 2,111
  - Density: 794/km^{2} (2,060/sq mi)
- Time zone: UTC+01:00 (CET)
  - Summer (DST): UTC+02:00 (CEST)
- Postal codes: 57584
- Dialling codes: 02741
- Vehicle registration: AK
- Website: www.betzdorf.de

Scheuerfeld is a municipality in the district of Altenkirchen, in Rhineland-Palatinate, in western Germany.

== Transport ==
Scheuerfeld is located at Sieg railway, served by the line RB90 (Limburg - Diez Ost - Westerburg - Hachenburg - Altenkirchen - Betzdorf - Siegen Hbf) of DreiLänderBahn, a section of Hessische Landesbahn (HLB) as well as Westerwald railway, which is currently out of service.
