= Hachenburg station =

Railway station in Germany

Hachenburg

General information
- Location: Hachenburg, Rhineland-Palatinate; Germany
- Coordinates: 50°39′50″N 7°49′22″E
- Lines: Limburg–Altenkirchen (km 50.6) (KBS 461); Selters–Hachenburg (km 23.4), closed
- Platforms: 2 (formerly 3)

Construction
- Accessible: Yes

Other information
- Station code: 2446
- DS100 code: KHAC
- IBNR: 8002494
- Category: 6
- Fare zone: VRM: 435
- Website: www.bahnhof.de

History
- Opened: 1 April 1885

Services
Preceding station	Hessische Landesbahn	Following station
Hattert towards Siegen Hbf	RB 90	Unnau-Korb towards Limburg (Lahn)
Location

Hachenburg station is located on the Limburg–Altenkirchen railway (Oberwesterwald Railway) in Hachenburg in the Westerwaldkreis district of Rhineland-Palatinate. From 1901 to 1951, it served as a junction for the Selters–Hachenburg railway (now closed). The station building is a listed historic monument.

== History ==
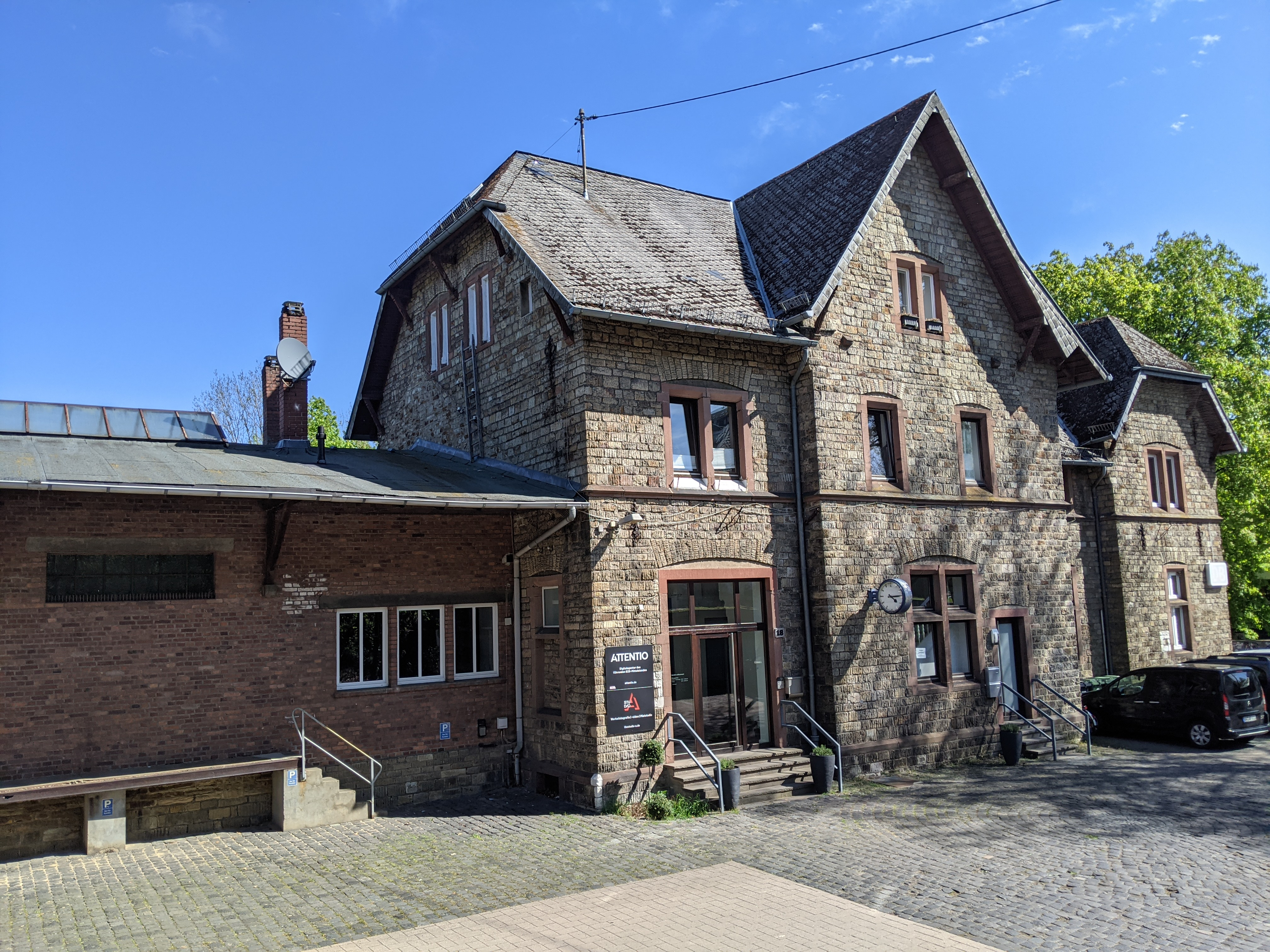
The station building viewed from the street side

Hachenburg station opened on 1 April 1885, coinciding with the launch of the Altenkirchen–Hachenburg section of the Limburg-Altenkirchen railway; the extension to Westerburg and Hadamar followed on 1 October 1886, and the Selters–Hachenburg light railway opened in 1901. The standard-gauge station originally featured four parallel tracks, two loading ramps, a station building with an attached freight shed, and a locomotive depot serving as an outpost of the Altenkirchen railway depot. The locomotive shed—likely built in 1884/85—was located at the station exit facing Altenkirchen and appears to have remained in use until after World War I. Two water cranes were also present.

The station for the meter-gauge light railway was situated south of the main station; facilities for transloading freight existed, though they were rarely used. Following the closure of the narrow-gauge line in 1951, all associated facilities were removed, and the site has since been built over. Only the light railway's station building remains.

Today, only two tracks with two ground-level platforms remain in operation; the station serves as a passing point on the single-track Limburg-Altenkirchen railway. Freight traffic no longer takes place. The heritage-listed station building, which includes an attached freight shed, is now in private use, while the mechanical signal box remains operational.

== Connections ==
In the 2026 timetable the following service stopped at the station:

Line	Route	Interval
RB 90	Siegen – Betzdorf – Wissen (Sieg) – Au (Sieg) – Altenkirchen (Westerw) – Hachenburg – Nistertal-Bad Marienberg – Westerburg – Dornburg – Hadamar – Elz – Staffel – Diez Ost – Limburg (Lahn)	Hourly. Extra services in the peak between Betzdorf and Altenkirchen.

Hachenburg station is served by a regional service (RB90), also called the Westerwald-Sieg-Bahn (Westerwald-Sieg railway) of the DreiLänderBahn, an operational section of the Hessische Landesbahn. The RB90 connects Lahn, Westerwald and Sieg.

The local bus station Hachenburg Bahnbof is served by line 270 (Hachenburg - Marienstatt Abbey - Elkenroth - Rosenheim (Westerwald) - Betzdorf (Sieg)).

There is a park and Ride (P+R) and a bike and ride (B+R) faciality located at Hachenburg station.

The Selters - Hachenburg narrow gauge railway is out of service and mostly deconstructed, only some properties are conserved like the station buildings in Selters and Höchstenbach, station building and a track in Hachenburg station and the former railway bridge in Hattert.

Hachenburg is located in the area of the transport association Verkehrsverbund Rhein-Mosel (VRM), in the fare zone number 435.

== Literature ==
- Willi Merzhäuser (1992), Die Kleinbahn Selters – Hachenburg (Selters - Hachenburg narrow gauge railway), Aachen: Schweers + Wall, ISBN 3-921679-72-9
