= Nauroth =

- Municipality
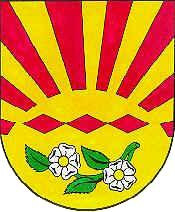
- Coat of arms

- Location of Nauroth within Altenkirchen district
- Interactive map of Nauroth
- Location within Germany Location within Rhineland-Palatinate
- Coordinates: 50°42′02″N 7°52′34″E
- Country: Germany
- State: Rhineland-Palatinate
- District: Altenkirchen
- Municipal assoc.: Betzdorf-Gebhardshain

Government
  - Mayor (2019–24): Gabi Heidrich

Area
  - Total: 6.86 km^{2} (2.65 sq mi)
- Elevation: 440 m (1,440 ft)

Population (2025-12-31)
  - Total: 1,229
  - Density: 179/km^{2} (464/sq mi)
- Time zone: UTC+01:00 (CET)
  - Summer (DST): UTC+02:00 (CEST)
- Postal codes: 57583
- Website: www.vggebhardshain.de

Nauroth is a municipality in the district of Altenkirchen, in Rhineland-Palatinate, in western Germany.

== Transport ==
Nauroth was connected to the trains of the Westerwald railway, but it is currently out of service.
