= Elben =

Municipality in Rhineland-Palatinate, Germany

- Municipality
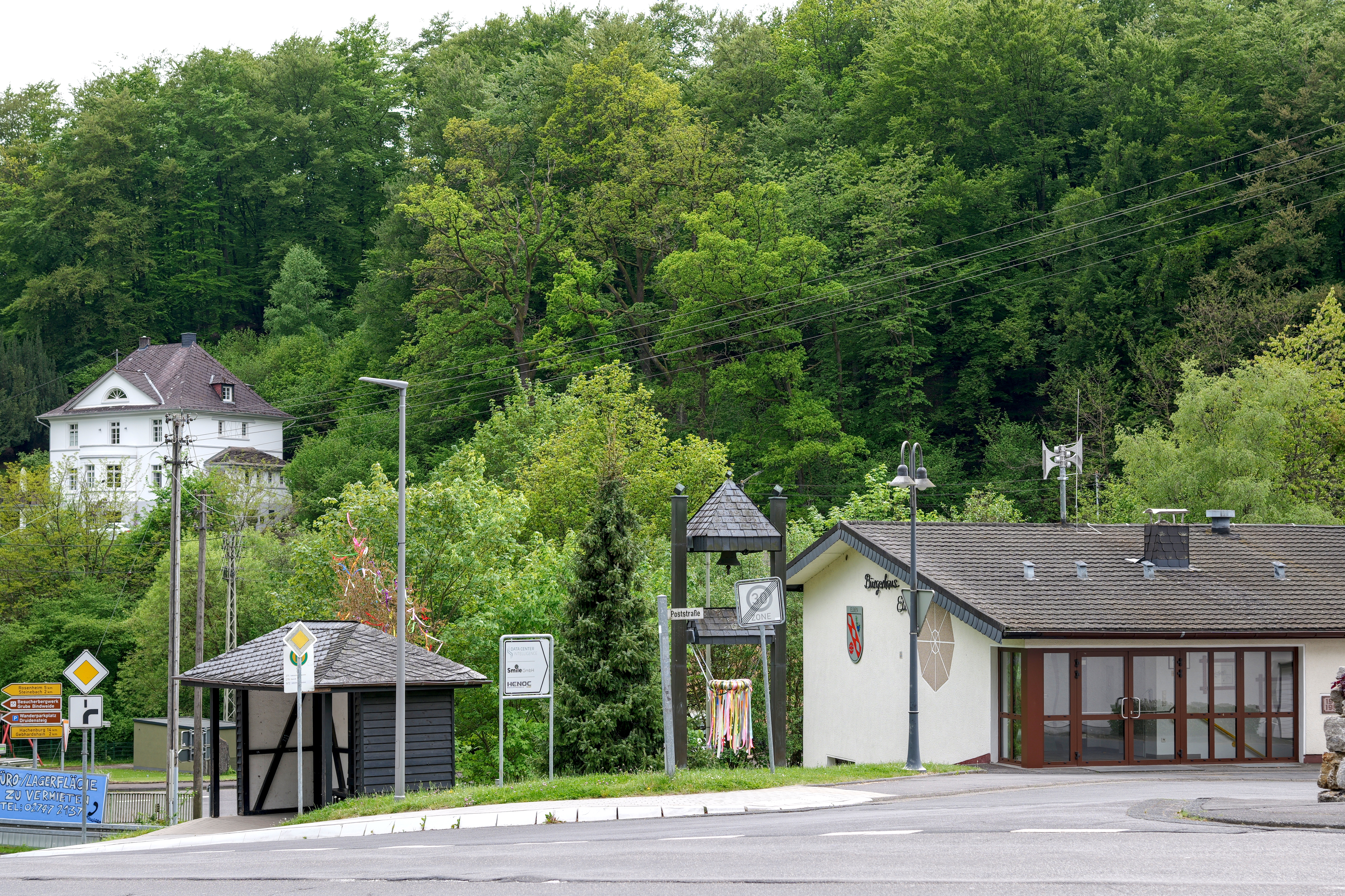

- Coat of arms

- Location of Elben within Altenkirchen district
- Interactive map of Elben
- Location within Germany Location within Rhineland-Palatinate
- Coordinates: 50°45′6″N 7°50′4″E
- Country: Germany
- State: Rhineland-Palatinate
- District: Altenkirchen
- Municipal assoc.: Betzdorf-Gebhardshain

Government
  - Mayor (2019–24): Hermann-Josef Neubert

Area
  - Total: 2.38 km^{2} (0.92 sq mi)
- Elevation: 295 m (968 ft)

Population (2025-12-31)
  - Total: 340
  - Density: 140/km^{2} (370/sq mi)
- Time zone: UTC+01:00 (CET)
  - Summer (DST): UTC+02:00 (CEST)
- Postal codes: 57580
- Dialling codes: 02747
- Vehicle registration: AK
- Website: www.elben.de

Elben is a municipality in the district of Altenkirchen, in Rhineland-Palatinate, Germany.

== Transport ==
In the past Elven had a stop at the Westerwald railway, but currently it is out of service.
