= Mine railway =

Type of railway that operates in a mine

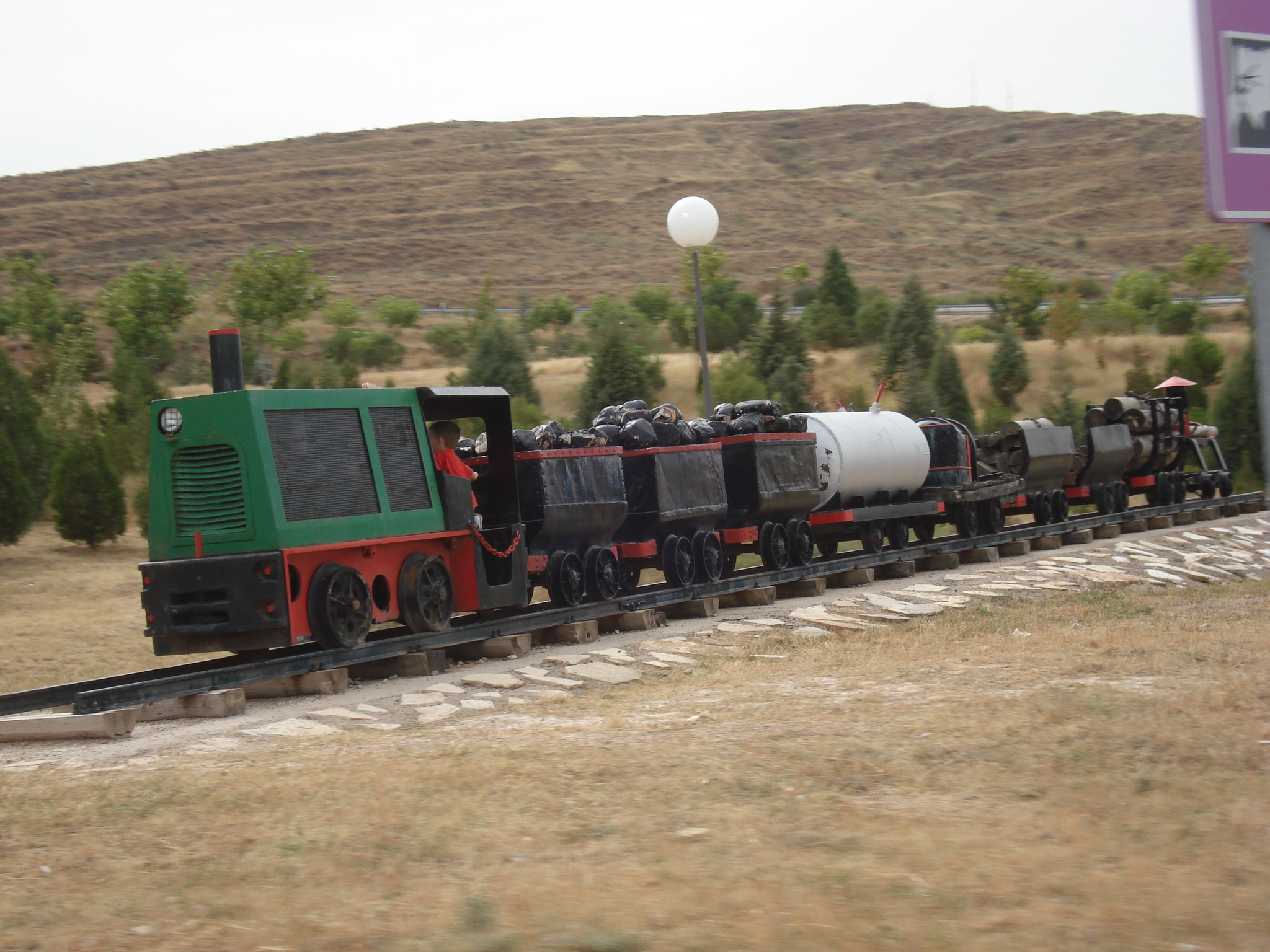
Preserved typical mine train at the Museu de Les Mines d' Eschucha, Eschucha, Spain

A mine railway (or mine railroad, U.S.), sometimes pit railway, is a railway constructed to carry materials and workers in and out of a mine. Materials transported typically include ore, coal, and overburden (also called variously spoils, waste, slack, culm, and tilings; all meaning waste rock). It is little remembered, but the mix of heavy and bulky materials which had to be hauled into and out of mines gave rise to the first several generations of railways, at first made of wooden rails, but eventually adding protective iron, steam locomotion by fixed engines and the earliest commercial steam locomotives, all in and around the works around mines.

== History ==
=== Mine rails ===
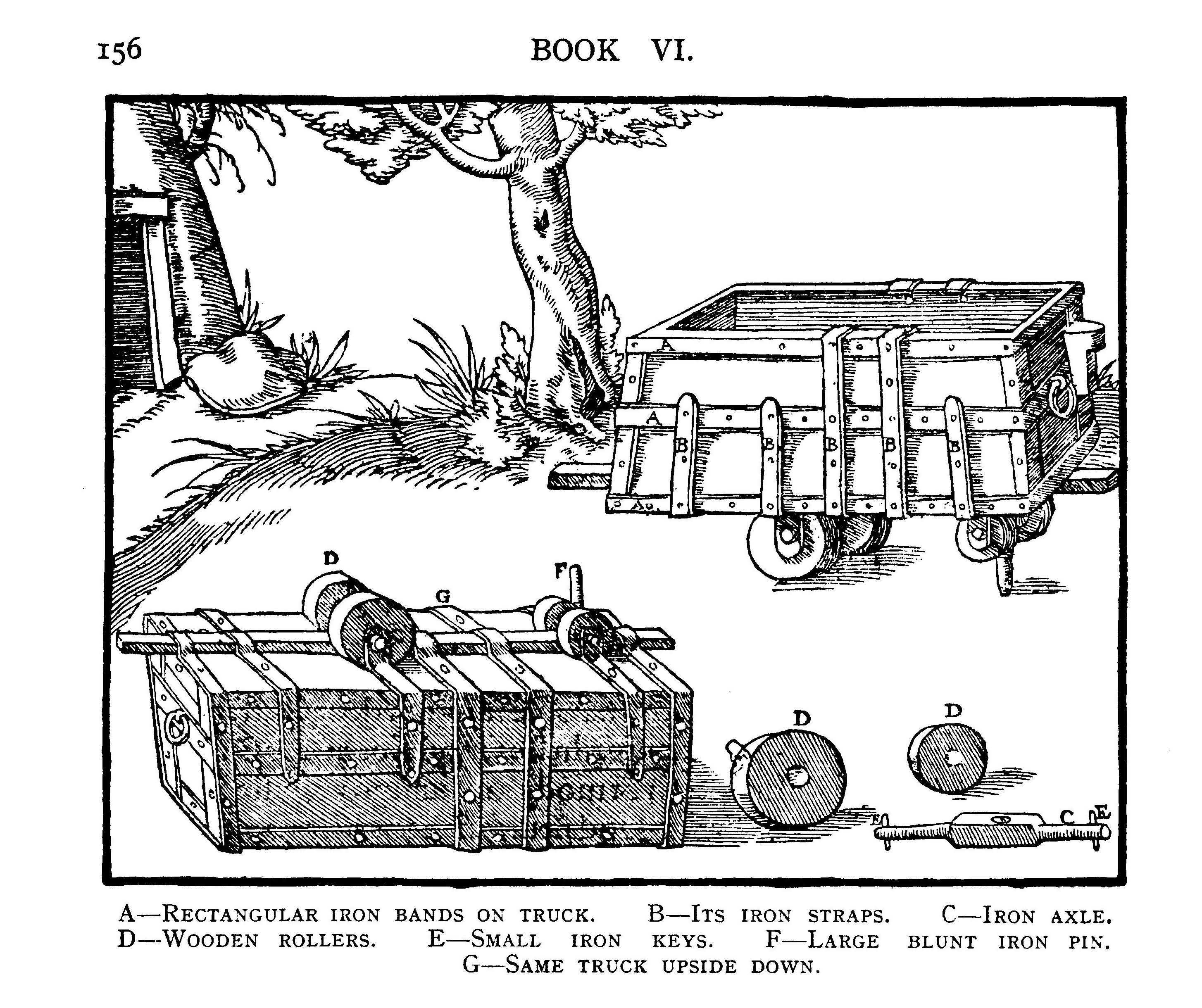
Minecart shown in De Re Metallica (1556). The guide pin fits in a groove between two wooden planks.

Wagonways (or tramways) were developed in Germany in the 1550s to facilitate the transport of ore tubs to and from mines, using primitive wooden rails. Such an operation was illustrated in 1556 by Georgius Agricola of Germany (Image right). This used "Hund" carts with unflanged wheels running on wooden planks and a vertical pin on the truck fitting into the gap between the planks, to keep it going the right way. Such a transport system was used by German miners at Caldbeck, Cumbria, England, perhaps from the 1560s. An alternative explanation derives it from the Magyar hintó – a carriage. There are possible references to their use in central Europe in the 15th century.

A funicular railway was made at Broseley in Shropshire, England at some time before 1605. This carried coal for James Clifford from his mines down to the River Severn to be loaded onto barges and carried to riverside towns. Though the first documentary record of this is later, its construction probably preceded the Wollaton Wagonway, completed in 1604, hitherto regarded as the earliest British installation. This ran from Strelley to Wollaton near Nottingham. Another early wagonway is noted onwards. Huntingdon Beaumont, who was concerned with mining at Strelley, also laid down broad wooden rails near Newcastle upon Tyne, on which a single horse could haul fifty to sixty bushels (130–150 kg) of coal.

By the 18th century, such wagonways and tramways existed in a number of areas. Ralph Allen, for example, constructed a tramway to transport stone from a local quarry to supply the needs of the builders of the Georgian terraces of Bath. The Battle of Prestonpans, in the Jacobite rising of 1745, was fought astride the 1722 Tranent – Cockenzie Waggonway. This type of transport spread rapidly through the whole Tyneside coalfield, and the greatest number of lines were to be found in the coalfield near Newcastle upon Tyne. They were mostly used to transport coal in chaldron wagons from the coalpits to a staithe (a wooden pier) on the river bank, whence coal could be shipped to London by collier brigs. The wagonways were engineered so that trains of coal wagons could descend to the staithe by gravity, being braked by a brakesman who would "sprag" the wheels by jamming them. Wagonways on less steep gradients could be retarded by allowing the wheels to bind on curves. As the work became more wearing on the horses, a vehicle known as a dandy wagon was introduced, in which the horse could rest on downhill stretches.

=== Coal, iron, rail symbiosis ===
A tendency to concentrate employees started when Benjamin Huntsman, looking for higher quality clock springs, found in 1740 that he could produce high quality steel in unprecedented quantities (crucible steel to replace blister steel) in using ceramic crucibles in the same fuel shortage/glass industry inspired reverbatory furnaces that were spurring the coal mining, coking, cast-iron cannon foundries, and the much in demand gateway or stimulus products of the glass making industries. These technologies, for several decades, had already begun gradually quickening industrial growth and causing early concentrations of workers so that there were occasional early small factories that came into being.

This trend concentrating effort into bigger central located but larger enterprises turned into a trend spurred by Henry Cort's iron processing patent of 1784 leading in short order to foundries collocating near coal mines and accelerating the practice of supplanting the nations cottage industries. With that concentration of employees and separation from dwellings, horsedrawn trams became commonly available as a commuter resource for the daily commute to work. Mine railways were used from 1804 around Coalbrookdale in such industrial concentrations of mines and iron works, all demanding traction-drawing of bulky or heavy loads. These gave rise to extensive early wooden rail ways and initial animal-powered trains of vehicles, then successively in just two decadesto protective iron strips nailed to protect the rails, to steam drawn trains (1804), and to cast-iron rails. Later, George Stephenson, inventor of the world-famous Rocket and a board member of a mine, convinced his board to use steam for traction. Next, he petitioned Parliament to license a public passenger railway, founding the Liverpool and Manchester Railway. Soon after the intense public publicity, in part generated by the contest to find the best locomotive won by Stephenson's Rocket, railways underwent explosive growth worldwide, and the industrial revolution gradually went global.

== Rails ==
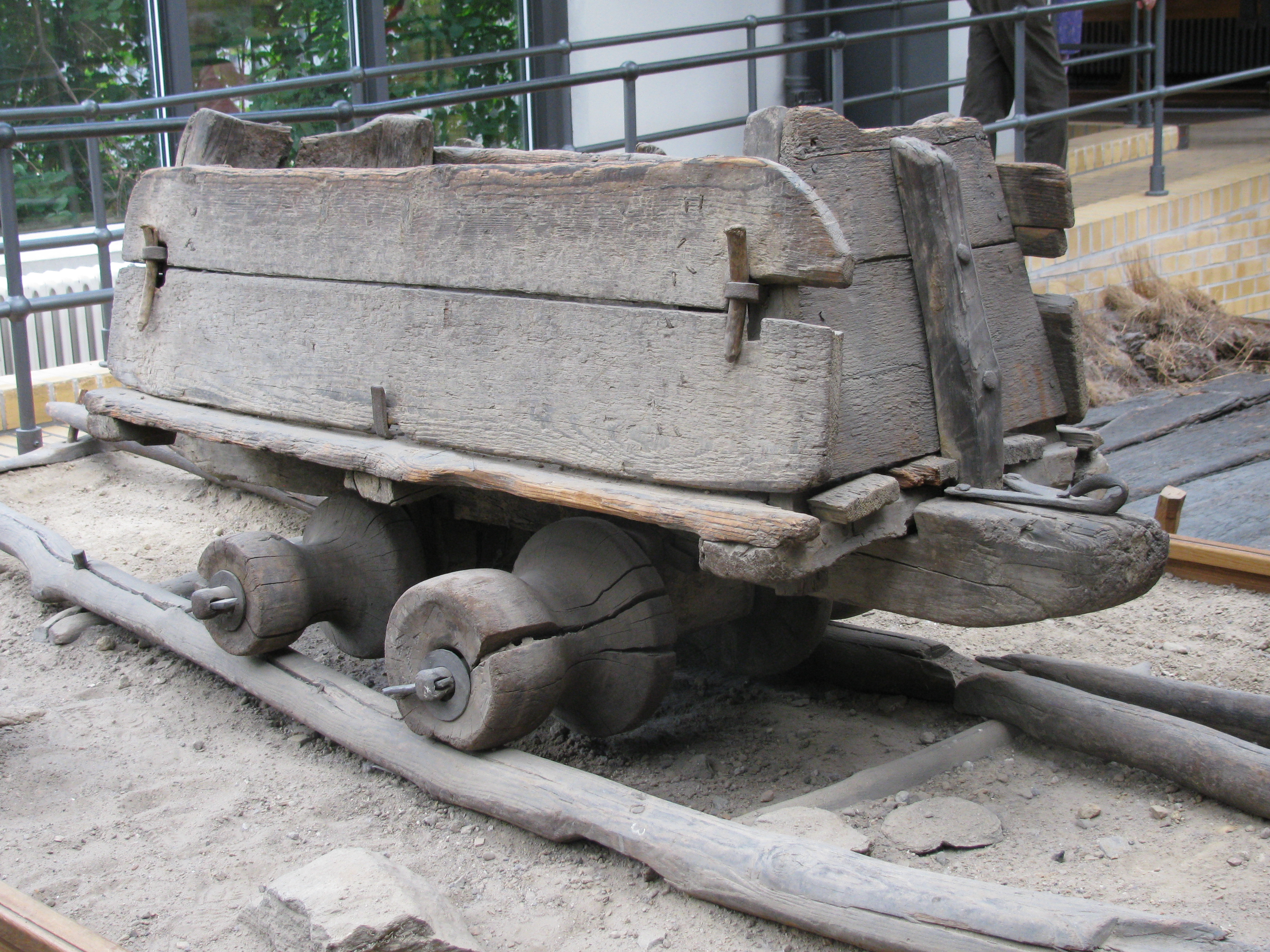
Mine wagon on wooden rails from Transylvania, end of the 16th century

There is usually no direct connection from a mine railway to the mine's industrial siding or the public railway network, because of the narrow-gauge track that is normally employed. In the United States, the standard gauge for mine haulage is 3 ft 6 in (1,067 mm), although gauges from 18 in (457 mm) to 5 ft 6 in (1,676 mm) are used.

Original mine railways used wax-impregnated wooden rails attached to wooden sleepers, on which drams were dragged by men, children or animals. This was later replaced by L-shaped iron rails, which were attached to the mine floor, meaning that no sleepers were required and hence leaving easy access for the feet of children or animals to propel more drams.

=== Wood to cast iron ===
These early mine railways used wooden rails, which in the early industrial revolution about Coalbrookdale, were soon capped with iron strapping, those were replaced by wrought iron, then with the first steam traction engines, cast-iron rails, and eventually steel rails as each was in succession found to last much longer than the previous cheaper rail type. By the time of the first steam locomotive-drawn trains, most rails laid were of wrought iron which was outlasting cast-iron rails by 8:1. About three decades later, after Andrew Carnegie had made steel competitively cheap, steel rails were supplanting iron for the same longevity reasons.

== Motive power ==
Riding on a mine car in Ashland, Pennsylvania

The tram (or dram) cars used for mine haulage are generally called tubs. The term mine car is commonly used in the United States

=== Humans ===
Mine workers have often been used to push mine carts. In the very cramped conditions of hand-hewn mining tunnels, children were also often used before the advent of child labour legislation, either pushing the carts themselves or tending to animals that did (see below).

=== Pit ponies ===
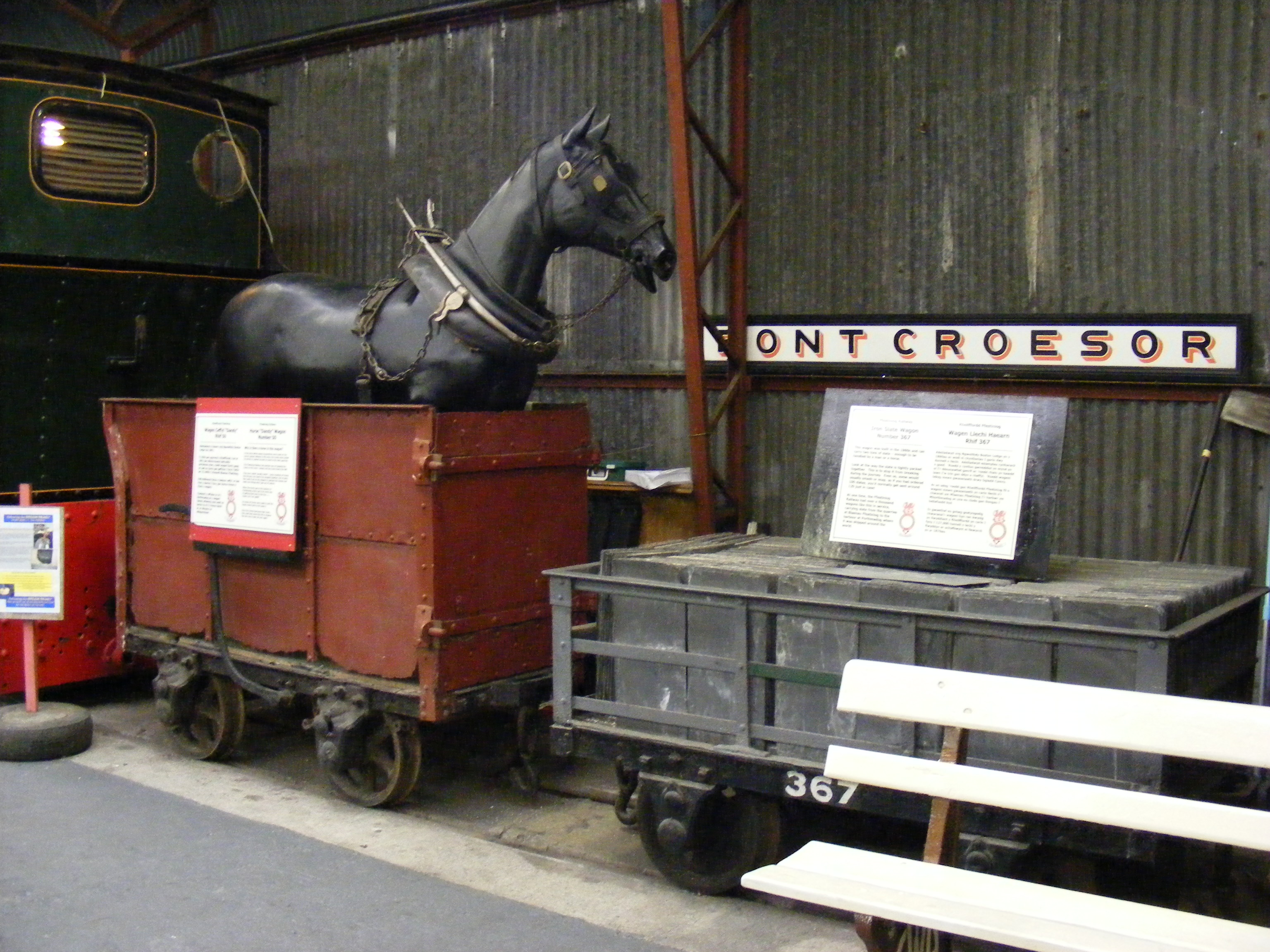
A preserved Dandy wagon of the Ffestiniog Railway. Before locomotives, slate trains would travel down to Porthmadog under gravity, and be pulled back up by horses

The Romans were the first to realise the benefits of using animals in their industrial workings, using specially bred pit ponies to power supplementary work such as mine pumps.

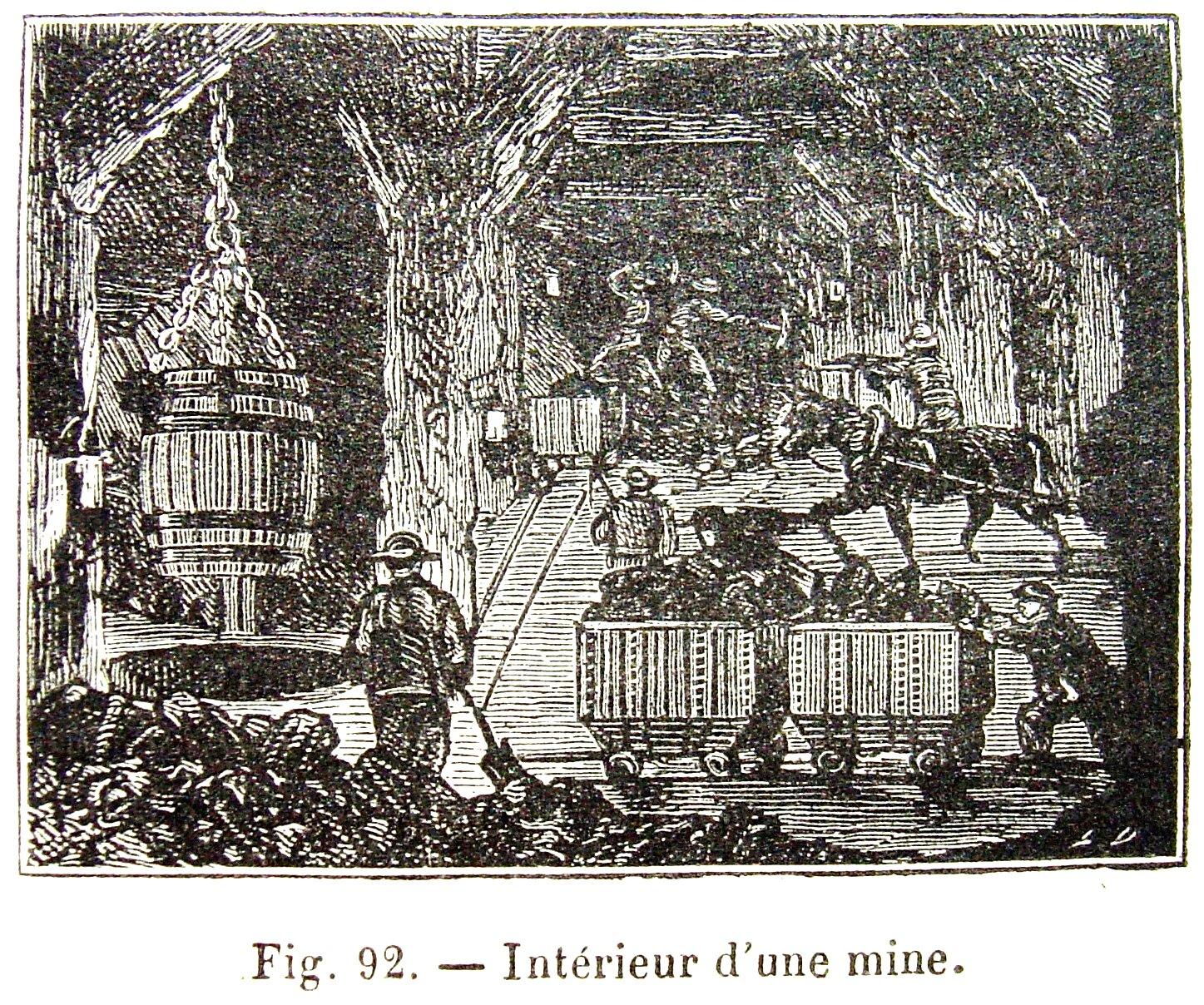
Pit ponies at work in 18th century French mine workings

Ponies began to be used underground, often replacing child or female labour, as distances from pit head to coal face became greater. The first known recorded use in Britain was in the County Durham coalfield in 1750; in the United States, mules were the dominant source of animal power in the mine industry, with horses and ponies used to a lesser extent. At the peak in 1913, there were 70,000 ponies underground in Britain. In later years, mechanical haulage was quickly introduced on the main underground roads replacing the pony hauls and ponies tended to be confined to the shorter runs from coal face to main road (known in North East England as "putting", in the United States as "tramming" or "gathering") which were more difficult to mechanise. As of 1984, 55 ponies were still at use with the National Coal Board in Britain, chiefly at the modern pit in Ellington, Northumberland.

Dandy wagons were often attached to trains of full drams, to contain a horse or pony. Mining and later railway engineers designed their tramways so that full (heavy) trains would use gravity down the slope, while horses would be used to pull the empty drams back to the workings. The Dandy wagon allowed for easy transportation of the required horse each time.

Probably the last colliery horse to work underground in a British coal mine, Robbie, was retired from Pant y Gasseg, near Pontypool, in May 1999.

=== Cable haulage ===
In the 19th century after the mid-1840s, when the German invention of wire rope became available from manufactories in both Europe and North America, large stationary steam engines on the surface with cables reaching underground were commonly used for mine haulage. Unsurprisingly, the innovation-minded managers of the Lehigh Coal & Navigation Company pioneered the technology in America using it to allow the dead-lift of loaded coal consists 1,100 feet (340 m) up the Ashley Planes, and the augmentation of their works in and above the Panther Creek Valley with new gravity switchback sections and return cable inclines, but most notably by installing two cable lift sections and expanding the already famous Mauch Chunk Switchback Railway with a 'back track' dropping car return time from 3–4 hours to about 20 minutes, which the new inclines then fed from new mine shafts and coal breakers farther down into the valley. Sometimes, stationary engines were even located underground, with the boiler on the surface, though that was a minority situation. All of the cable haulage methods were primarily used on the main haulage ways of the mine. Typically, manual labor, mules or pit ponies were used in gathering filled cars from the working areas (galleries were driven across seams as much as possible) to main haulage ways. In the first decade of the 20th century, electric locomotives were displacing animal power for this secondary haulage role in mines where sparking triggered explosive methane buildup was a lesser danger. Several cable haulage systems were used:

In slope mines, where there was a continuous downgrade from the entrance to the working face, the rope from the hoisting engine could be used to lower empty cars into the mine and then raise full cars. In shaft mines, secondary hoisting engines could be used to pull cars on grades within the mine. For grades of a few percent, trains of 25 cars each carrying roughly half a ton were typical in the 1880s.

In mines where grades were not uniform or where the grades were not steep enough for gravity to pull a train into the mine, the main hoisting rope could be augmented with a tail rope connected to the opposite end of the train of mine cars. The tail-rope system had its origins on cable-hauled surface inclines prior to the 1830s. This was the dominant system in the 1880s Frequently, one engine was used to work both ropes, with the tail rope reaching into the mine, around a pulley at the far end, and then out again.

Finally, the most advanced systems involved continuous loops of rope operated like a cable car system. Some mines used endless chains before wire-rope became widely available. The endless chain system originated in the mines near Burnley (England) around 1845. An endless rope system was developed in Nottinghamshire around 1864, and another independently developed near Wigan somewhat later (also in England). In these systems, individual cars or trains within the mine could be connected to the cable by a grip comparable to the grips used on surface cable car systems. In some mines, the haulage chain or cable went over the top of the cars, and cars were released automatically when the chain or cable was lifted away by an overhead pulley. Where the cable ran under the cars, a handheld grip could be used, where the grip operator would ride on the front car of the train working the grip chained to the front of the car. In some cases, a separate grip car was coupled to the head of the train. At the dawn of the 20th century, endless rope haulage was the dominant haulage technology for the main haulage ways of underground mines.

=== Steam locomotives ===
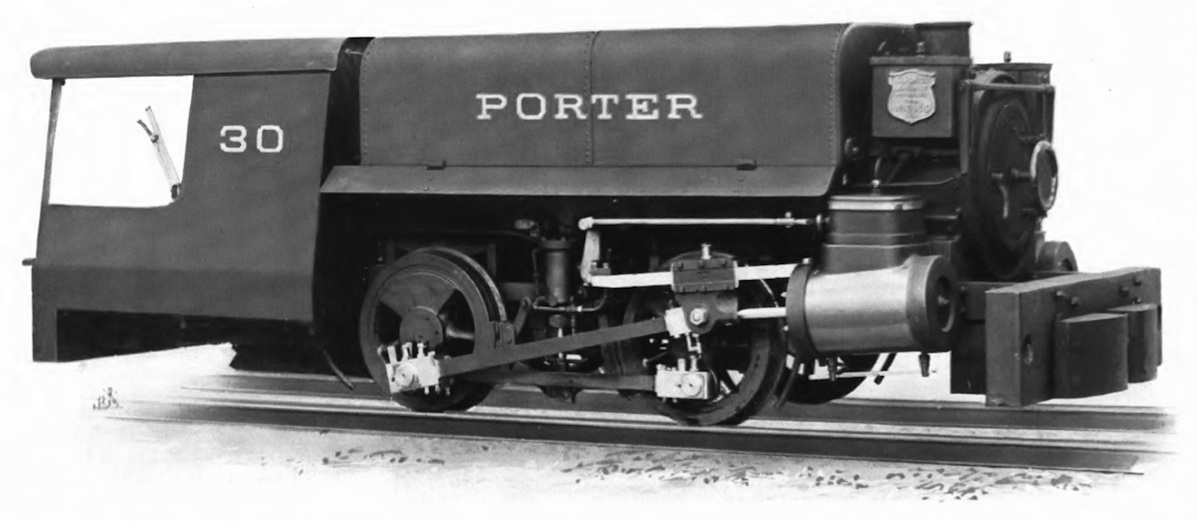
A tank locomotive advertised in the H.K. Porter, Inc. 1908 catalog for use in underground mines

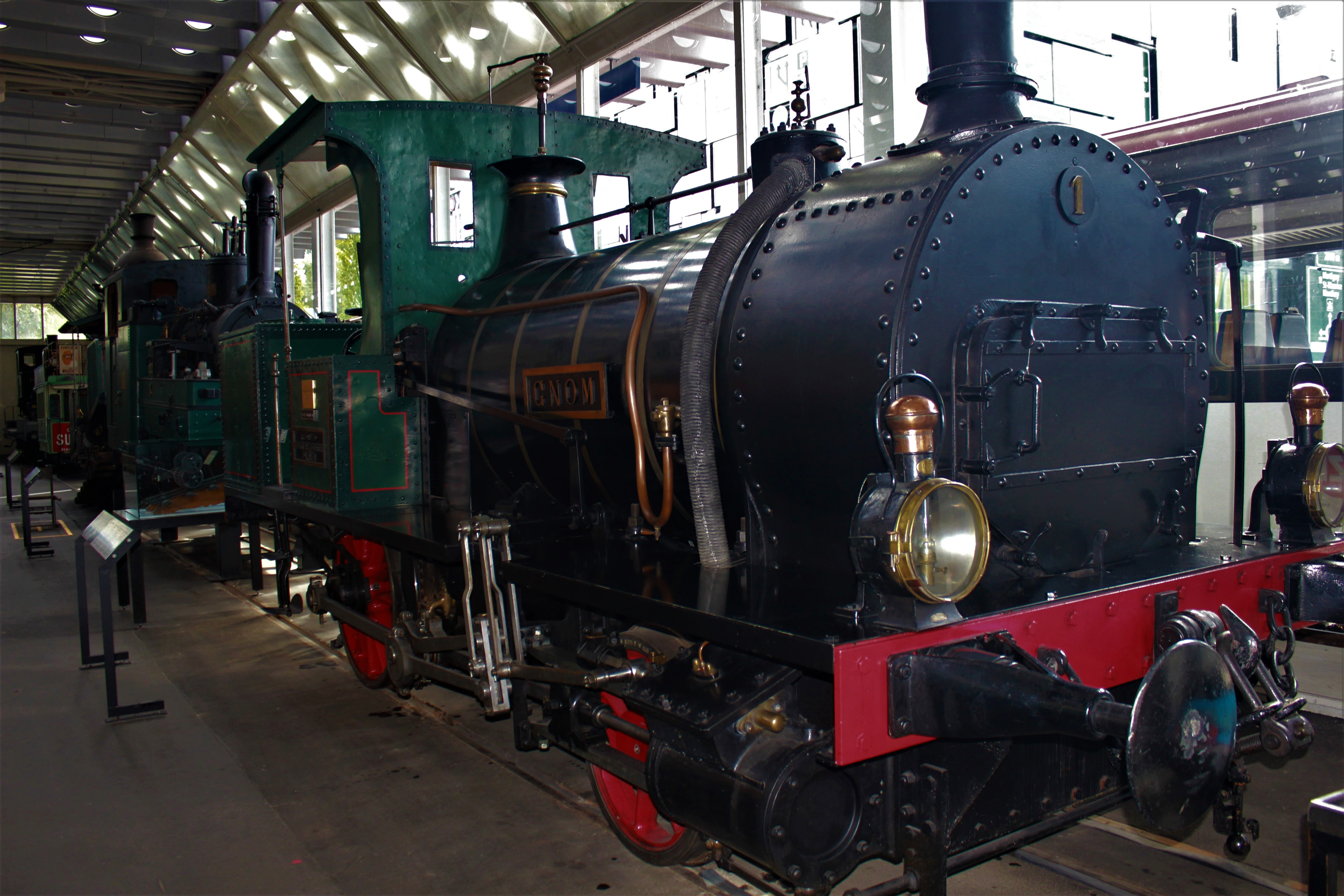
Gnom, used on a mine in Switzerland

For as long as it was economical to operate steam locomotives on the general railway system, steam locomotives were also used on the surface trackage of mines. In the 19th and early 20th centuries, some large mines routinely used steam locomotives underground. Locomotives for this purpose were typically very squat tank engines with an 0-4-0 wheel arrangement. Use of steam power underground was only practical in areas with very high exhaust airflow, with engine speed limits of 1/2 the air velocity to assure adequate clean air for the crew on outbound trips. Such engines could not be used in mines with firedamp problems.

Porter, Bell & Co. appears to have built the first underground mining locomotives used in the United States around 1870. By 1874, the Consolidation Coal Company and Georges Creek Coal and Iron Company were using several Porter locomotives in their underground mines in the Georges Creek Valley of Maryland. Other users included several coal mines near Pittsburgh, Pennsylvania, the Lehigh Coal and Navigation Company and an iron mine in the Lake Superior Iron Ranges. Porter's mine locomotives required a minimum 5-foot clearance and 4-foot width when operating on 3-foot gauge track, where they could handle a 20-foot radius curve. The Baldwin Locomotive Works built similar locomotives, starting in 1870. By the early 20th century, very small British-made oil-fired steam locomotives were in use in some South African mines. Porter and Vulcan (Wilkes-Barre) advertised steam mine locomotives in 1909 and 1911. By the early 1920s, only a few small mines in the Pocahontas Coalfield in West Virginia were using steam locomotives underground. Nonetheless, both Baldwin and Vulcan continued to advertise steam locomotives for underground use outside the coal industry as late as 1921.

=== Compressed air locomotives ===
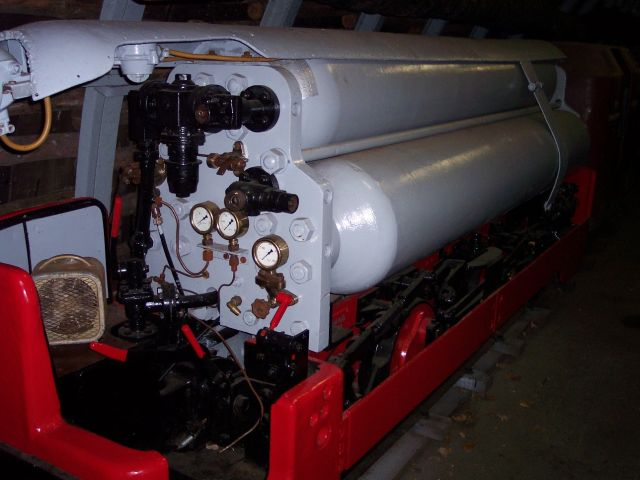
Compressed air mine locomotive

Compressed-air locomotives were powered by compressed air carried on the locomotive in compressed-air containers. This method of propulsion had the advantage of being safe but the disadvantage of high operating costs due to very limited range before it was necessary to recharge the air tanks. Generally, compressors on the surface were connected by plumbing to recharge stations located throughout the mine. Recharging was generally very fast. Narrow gauge compressed air locomotives were manufactured for mines in Germany as early as 1875, with tanks pressurized to 4 or 5 bar. The Baldwin Locomotive Works delivered their first compressed air locomotive in 1877, and by 1904, they offered a variety of models, most with an 0-4-0 wheel arrangement. Compressed air locomotives were introduced in the Newbottle Collieries in Scotland in 1878, operating at 200 psi (14 bar).

Ordinary mine compressed-air systems operating at 100 psi (7 bar) only allowed a few hundred feet of travel. By the late 1880s, Porter was building locomotives designed for 500 to 600 psi (34-41 bar). By the early 1900s, locomotive air tank pressures had increased to from 600 to 800 psi (41-55 bar), although pressures up to 2000 psi (140 bar) were already envisioned. In 1911, Vulcan (Wilkes-Barre) was selling single-tank compressed-air locomotives operating at 800 psi (55 bar), double-tank models up to 1000 psi (69 bar) and one 6-tank model that may have operated at a much higher pressure. The Homestake in South Dakota, USA used such high pressures, with special compressors and distribution piping. Except for very small prospects and remote small mines, battery or diesel locomotives have replaced compressed air.

=== Overhead-electric locomotives ===
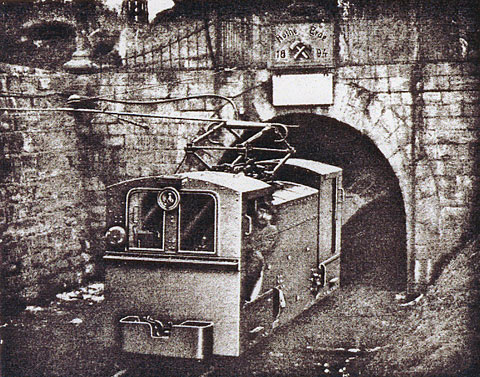
Mine locomotive U 28 from AEG at the Verein Rothe Erde, Esch-sur-Alzette 1894

The electric motor technology used pre-1900 to DC with a few hundred volts and a direct supply of power to the motor from the overhead wire enabled the use of efficient, small and sturdy tractors of simple construction. Initially, there was no voltage standard, but by 1914, 250 volts was the standard voltage for underground work in the United States. This relatively low voltage was adopted for safety's sake.

The first electric mine railway in the world was developed by Siemens & Halske for bituminous coal mining in Saxon Zauckerode near Dresden (now Freital) and was being worked as early as 1882 on the 5th main cross-passage of the Oppel Shaft run by the Royal Saxon Coal Works.

In 1894, the mine railway of the Aachen smelting company, Rothe Erde, was electrically driven, as were subsequently numerous other mine railways in the Rhineland, Saarland Lorraine, Luxembourg and Belgian Wallonia. There were large scale deliveries of electric locomotives for these railways from AEG, Siemens & Halske, Siemens-Schuckert Works (SSW) and the Union Electricitäts-Gesellschaft (UEG) in these countries.

The first electric mine locomotive in the United States went into service in mid 1887 in the Lykens Valley Coal Company mine in Lykens, Pennsylvania. The 35 hp motor for this locomotive was built by the Union Electric Company of Philadelphia. The 15000 pound (6800 kg) locomotive was named the Pioneer, and by mid 1888, a second electric locomotive was in service at that mine. Use in the Appalachian coal fields spread rapidly. By 1903, there were over 600 electric mine locomotives in use in America with new ones being produced at a rate of 100 per year.

Initially, electric locomotives were used only where it was economical to string overhead line for power. This limited their usage for gathering loads at the mine face, where trackage was temporary and frequently relocated. This motivated the development of battery locomotives, but in the first decade of the 20th century the first successful electric gathering locomotives used cable reels. To run on tracks away from overhead lines, the power cable was clipped to the overhead line and then automatically unreeled as the locomotive advanced and reeled up as the locomotive returned.

Crab locomotives were equipped with a winch for pulling cars out of the un-powered tracks. This approach allowed use of temporary track that was too light to carry the weight of the a cable-reel or battery locomotive. The disadvantage of a crab locomotive was that someone had to pull the haulage cable from the winch to the working face, threading it over pulleys at any sharp turns.

Explosion-proof mining locomotives from Schalker Eisenhütte are used in all the mines owned by Ruhrkohle (today Deutsche Steinkohle).

=== Internal-combustion locomotives ===
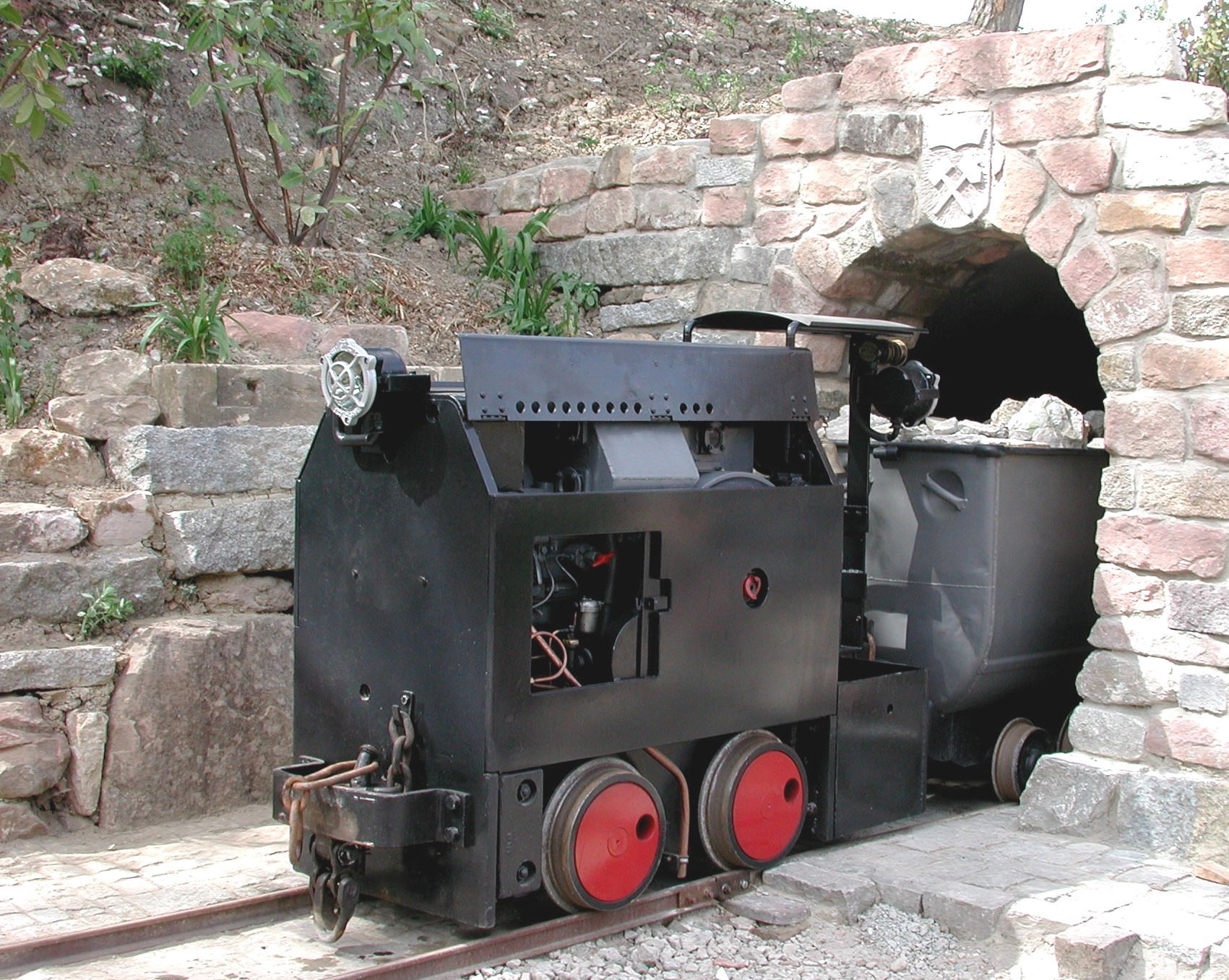
1938 Deutz mine railway locomotive.

The Gasmotorenfabrik Deutz (Deutz Gas Engine Company), now Deutz AG, introduced a single-cylinder benzine locomotive for use in mines in 1897. Their first mining locomotives were rated at 6 to 8 hp (4.5 to 6.0 kW) and weighed 5,280 pounds (2,390 kg). The original 6 hp (4.5 kW) engine was 8 feet 6.5 inches (2.60 m) long, 3 feet 11 inches (1.19 m) wide and 4 feet 3.5 inches (1.31 m) high and weighed 2.2 long tons (2.46 short tons; 2.24 t). Typical Deutz mine engines in 1906 were rated at 8 to 12 hp (6.0 to 8.9 kW). By this time, double-cylinder 18 hp (13 kW). engines built by Wolseley Motors were being used in South African mines. By 1914, Whitcomb Locomotive Works, Vulcan Iron Works, and Milwaukee Locomotive Manufacturing Co. (later merged with Whitcomb) were making gasoline mining locomotives in the United States with 4 and 6 cylinder engines.

Late 19th and early 20th century mine railway locomotives were operated with petrol benzene and alcohol / benzene mixtures. Although such engines were initially used in metal mines, they were in routine use in coal mines by 1910. Firedamp safety was achieved by wire gauze shields over intake and exhaust ports as well as cooling water injection in the exhaust system. Bubbling the exhaust through a water bath also greatly reduced noxious fumes.

For safety (noxious fumes as well as flammability of the fuel) modern mine railway internal combustion locomotives are only operated using diesel fuel. Catalytic scrubbers reduce carbon monoxide. Other locomotives are electric, either battery or trolley.

=== Battery-electric locomotives ===
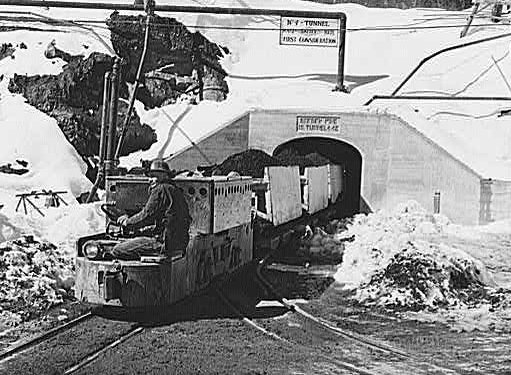
Trainload of chrome ore emerging from a mine tunnel at the Ben Bow chromite mine in Stillwater County, Montana

Battery powered locomotives and systems solved many of the potential problems that combustion engines present, especially regarding fumes, ventilation and heat generation. Compared to simple electric locomotives, battery locomotives do not need trolley wire strung over each track. However, batteries are heavy items which used to require long periods of charge to produce relatively short periods of full-power operation, resulting in either restricted operations or the need for the doubling-up of equipment purchasing.

In the 19th century, there was considerable speculation about the potential use of battery locomotives in mines. By 1899, Baldwin-Westinghouse had delivered an experimental battery locomotive to a Virginia mine; battery recharging occurred whenever the locomotive was running under trolley wire, while it could run from battery when working on temporary trackage near the face. This locomotive was eventually successful, but only after the voltage on the trolley system was stabilized. A Siemens and Haske pure storage battery locomotive was in use in a coal mine in Gelsenkirchen (Germany) by 1904.

One problem with battery locomotives was battery replacement. This was simplified by use of removable battery boxes. Eventually, battery boxes were developed that included wheels so that they could be rolled off of the locomotive. While the initial motivation had to do with battery maintenance, the primary use for this idea was at charging stations where a discharged battery box could be rolled off and replaced with a freshly charged box.

While popular, battery systems were often practically restricted to mines where systems were short, and moving relatively low-density ore which could explode easily. Today, heavy-duty batteries provide full-shift (8 hours) operations with one or more spare batteries charging.

== In operation ==
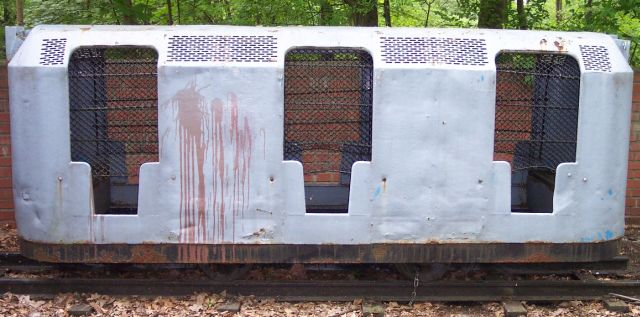
Passenger wagon on a mine railway

Until 1995 the largest single, narrow gauge, above-ground, mine and coal railway network in Europe was in the Leipzig-Altenburg lignite field in Germany. It had 726 kilometres (451 mi) of 900 mm (2 ft 11 7/16 in) – the largest 900 mm (2 ft 11 7/16 in) network in existence. Of this, about 215 kilometres was removable track inside the actual pits and 511 kilometres was fixed track for the transportation of coal to the main rail network.

The last 900 mm (2 ft 11 7/16 in) gauge mine railway in the German state of Saxony, a major mining area in central Europe, was closed in 1999 at the Zwenkau Mine in Leipzig. Once a very extensive railway network, towards the end it only had 70 kilometres (43 mi) of movable 900 mm (2 ft 11 7/16 in) track and 90 kilometres (56 mi) of 900 mm (2 ft 11 7/16 in) fixed railway track within the Zwenkau open cast mine site itself, as well as a 20 kilometres (12 mi), standard gauge, link railway for the coal trains to the power stations (1995–1999). The closure of this mine marked the end of the history of 900 mm (2 ft 11 7/16 in) mine railways in the lignite mines of Saxony. In December 1999, the last 900 mm (2 ft 11 7/16 in) railway in the Central German coal mining field in Lusatia was closed.

In the United States, Consol Energy's Shoemaker Mine, covering a large area east of Benwood, West Virginia was the last underground coal mine to use rail haulage. Starting in 2006, 12 miles of underground conveyor belt and 2.5 miles of above ground conveyor belt were installed. The last load of coal was hauled by rail in January 2010.

== Museum and heritage railways ==
A remnant of the coal railways in the Leipzig-Altenburg Lignite Field may be visited and operated as a museum railway. Regular museum trains also run on the line from Meuselwitz via Haselbach to Regis-Breitingen.

== Mine railways in visitor mines ==
=== Austria ===
1. Pradeisstollen, Radmer in the Styria
2. Schwaz Silver Mine

=== Germany ===
Hesse

1. Grube Fortuna, Solms, visitor mine with working shaft, field and pit railway museum with circular track, 600 mm (1 ft 11 5/8 in), 2.3 km (1.4 mi) long

Lower Saxony

1. Barsinghausen, Klosterstollen, 600 mm (1 ft 11 5/8 in), 13 km (8.1 mi) long
2. Clausthal-Zellerfeld–Clausthal, Ottiliae Shaft, open pit railway to the old station in Clausthal, 600 mm (1 ft 11 5/8 in), 2.2 km (1.4 mi)
3. Goslar, Rammelsberg
4. Langelsheim–Lautenthal, Lautenthals Glück Pit

North Rhine-Westphalia

1. Bestwig–Ramsbeck, Ramsbeck Ore Mine
2. Kleinenbremen, Kleinenbremen Visitor Mine

Rhineland-Palatinate

1. Steinebach/Sieg, Bindweide Pit

Saxony

1. Annaberg-Buchholz, Markus Röhling Stolln, 600 mm (1 ft 11 5/8 in)
2. Ehrenfriedersdorf, Sauberg (underground section only), 600 mm (1 ft 11 5/8 in)

Saxony-Anhalt

1. Elbingerode (Harz), Drei Kronen & Ehrt visitor mine, 600 mm (1 ft 11 5/8 in)
2. Sangerhausen–Wettelrode, Röhrigschacht show mine

Thuringia

1. Ilfeld–Netzkater, Rabensteiner Stollen, 600 mm (1 ft 11 5/8 in)

=== Luxembourg ===
1. Minièresbunn, Fond-de-Gras, 700 mm (2 ft 3 9/16 in), 4 km (2.5 mi) long
2. National Museum of Luxembourg Iron Ore Mines, circular track

== See also ==
- Industrial railway
- Granite Railway
- Mantrip (shuttle for transporting miners)
- Mine car
- Minecart
- Plateway
- Quarry tub
- Rail profile
- Rail tracks
- Wagonway
