= Betzdorf-Gebhardshain =

- Verbandsgemeinde
- Location of Betzdorf-Gebhardshain within Landkreis Altenkirchen district
- Interactive map of Betzdorf-Gebhardshain
- Location within Germany Location within Rhineland-Palatinate
- Coordinates: 50.787738°N 7.874415°E
- Country: Germany
- State: Rhineland-Palatinate
- District: Landkreis Altenkirchen
- Subdivisions: 17 Gemeinden

Government
  - Mayor (2016–24): Bernd Brato (SPD)

Area
  - Total: 73.51 km^{2} (28.38 sq mi)

Population (2025-12-31)
  - Total: 26,670
  - Density: 362.8/km^{2} (939.7/sq mi)
- Time zone: UTC+01:00 (CET)
  - Summer (DST): UTC+02:00 (CEST)
- Vehicle registration: AK
- Website: www.vg-bg.de

Betzdorf-Gebhardshain is a Verbandsgemeinde ("collective municipality") in the district of Altenkirchen, in Rhineland-Palatinate, Germany. The seat of the Verbandsgemeinde is in Betzdorf. It was formed on 1 January 2017 by the merger of the former Verbandsgemeinden Betzdorf and Gebhardshain.

The Verbandsgemeinde Betzdorf-Gebhardshain consists of the following Ortsgemeinden ("local municipalities"):

Municipality	Area (km²)	Population
Alsdorf	5.93	1483
Betzdorf *	9.57	10367
Dickendorf	1.45	363
Elben	2.38	340
Elkenroth	8.15	1816
Fensdorf	2.17	412
Gebhardshain	5.97	1840
Grünebach	2.52	531
Kausen	3.61	789
Malberg	4.31	1063
Molzhain	2.91	523
Nauroth	6.86	1229
Rosenheim	4.10	751
Scheuerfeld	2.66	2111
Steinebach/Sieg	4.55	1319
Steineroth	2.53	542
Wallmenroth	3.84	1191
Verbandsgemeinde Betzdorf-Gebhardshain	73.51	26670

^{*} seat of the Verbandsgemeinde
