= Grünebach =

- Municipality
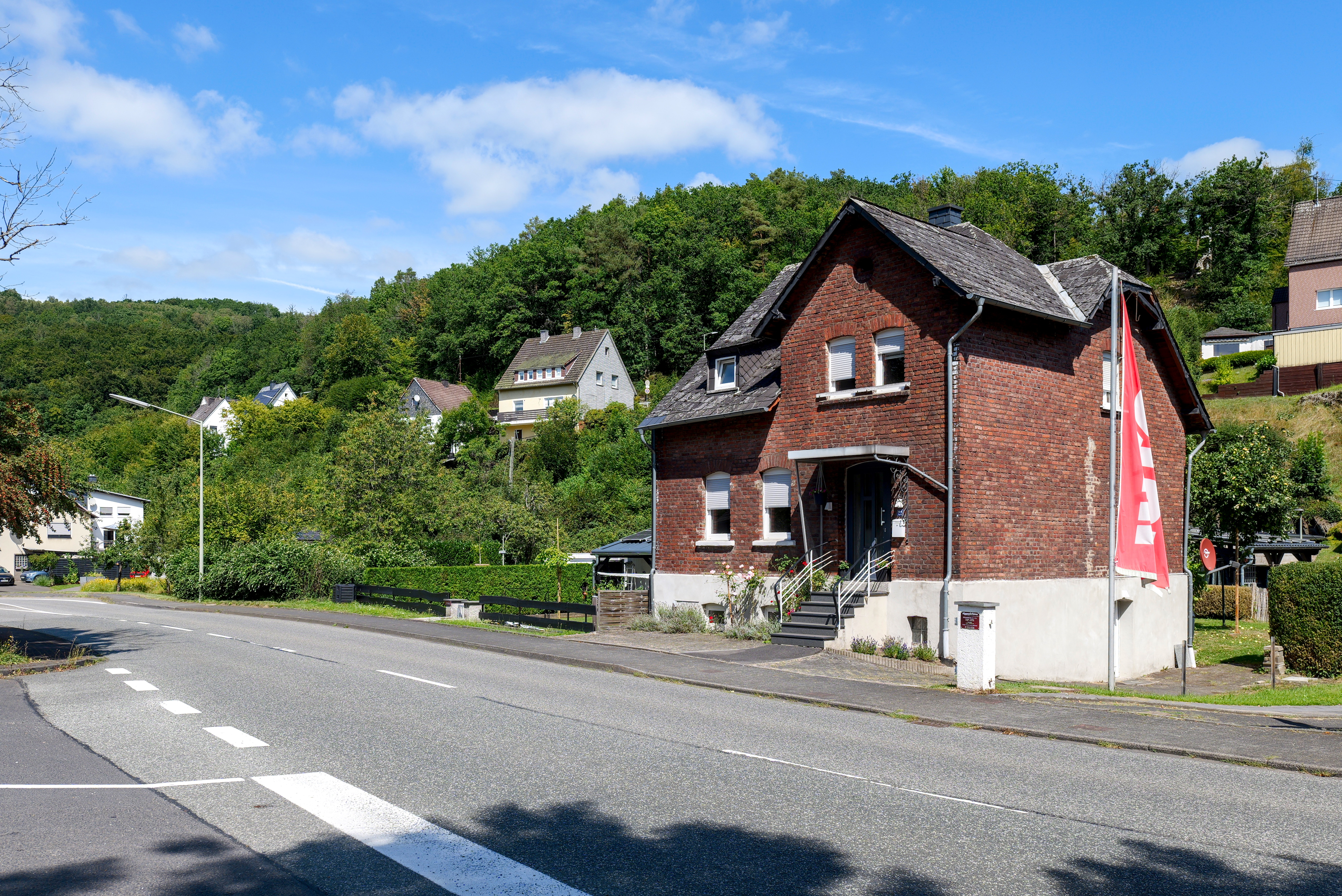

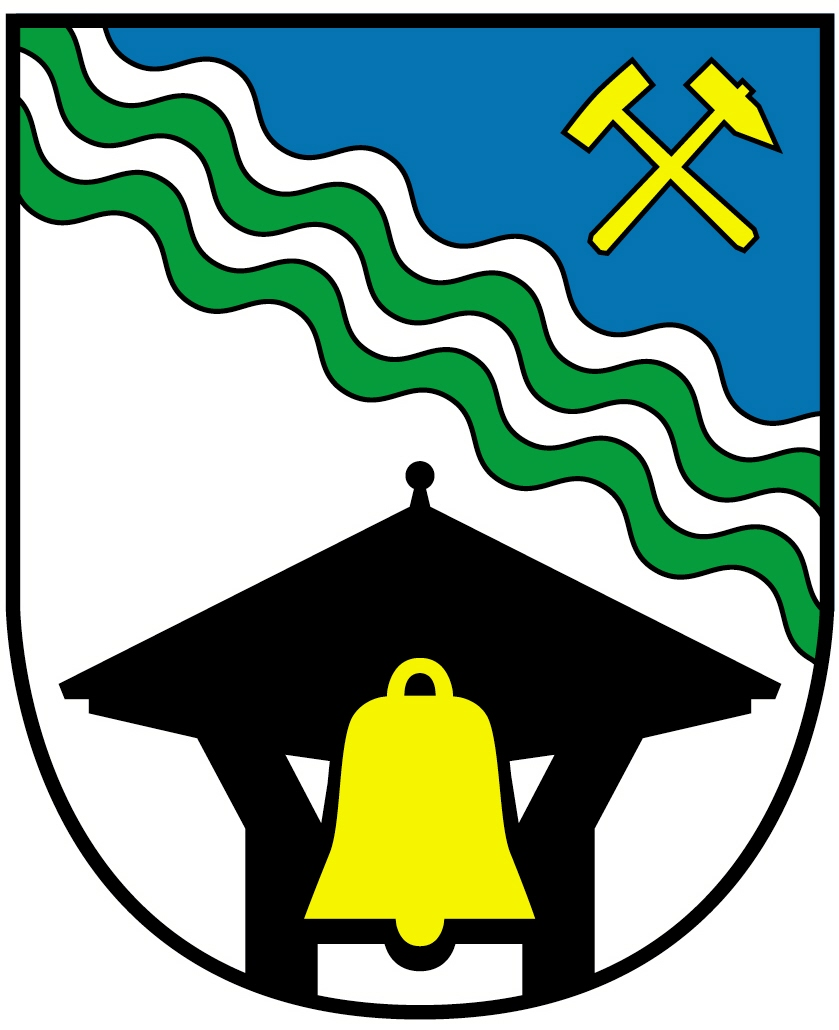
- Coat of arms

- Location of Grünebach within Altenkirchen (Westerwald) district
- Interactive map of Grünebach
- Location within Germany Location within Rhineland-Palatinate
- Coordinates: 50°46′39″N 7°54′21″E
- Country: Germany
- State: Rhineland-Palatinate
- District: Altenkirchen (Westerwald)
- Municipal assoc.: Betzdorf-Gebhardshain

Government
  - Mayor (2019–24): Mike Pfeifer

Area
  - Total: 2.50 km^{2} (0.97 sq mi)
- Elevation: 230 m (750 ft)

Population (2025-12-31)
  - Total: 531
  - Density: 212/km^{2} (550/sq mi)
- Time zone: UTC+01:00 (CET)
  - Summer (DST): UTC+02:00 (CEST)
- Postal codes: 57520
- Dialling codes: 02741
- Vehicle registration: AK

Grünebach is a municipality in the district of Altenkirchen, in Rhineland-Palatinate, in western Germany.

== Transport ==
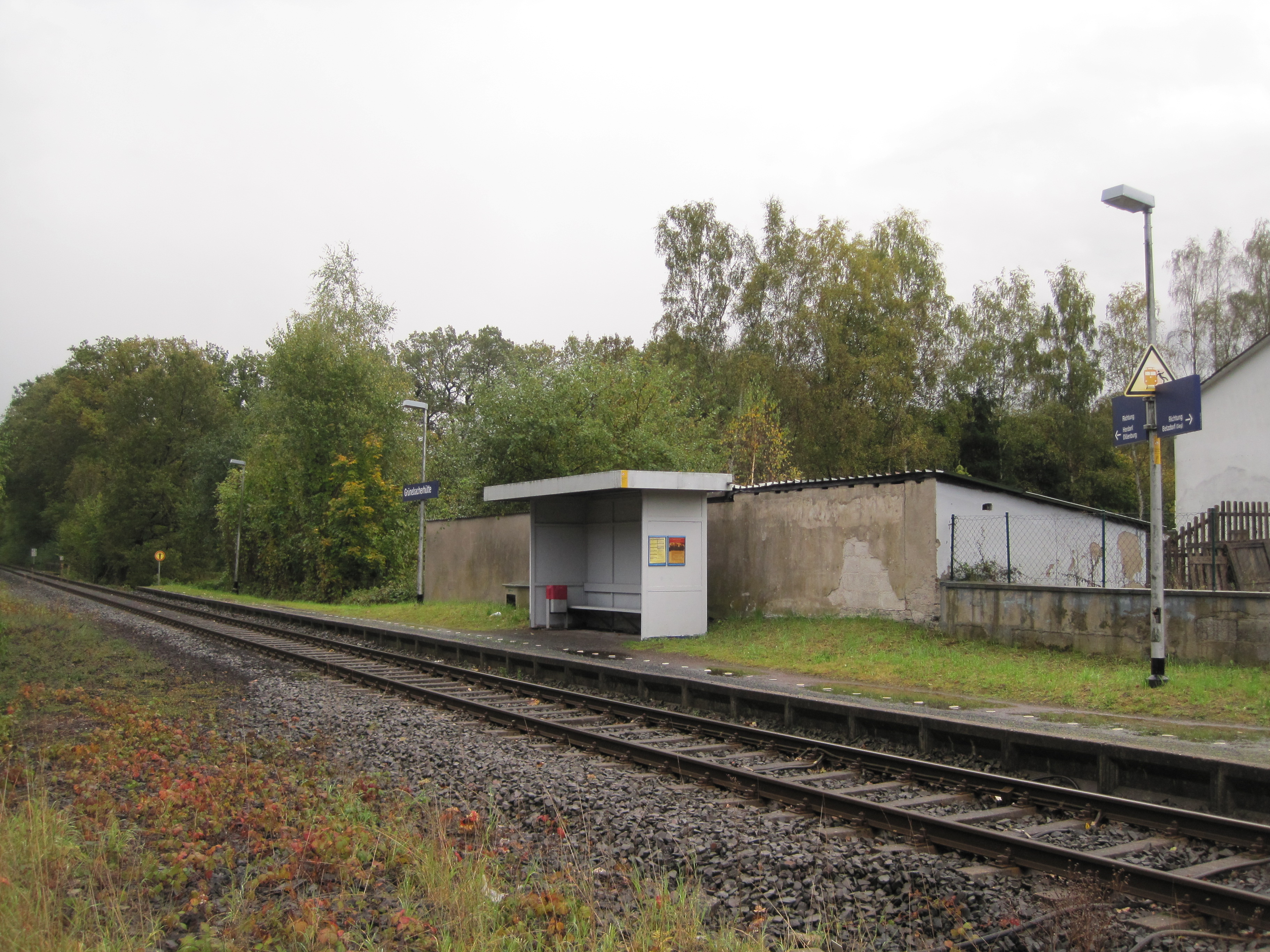
Grünebacherhütte stop along the RB96 line

There's access to the public local bus transport through the lines 278 and N73.

Grünebacherhütte stop and Grünebach Ort stop are located at the RB96 line (Betzdorf–Haiger railway) of DreiLänderBahn, a section of Hessische Landesbahn (HLB).

Alsdorf stop on the RB97 (Betzdorf–Daaden railway), also very close.

Grünebach is located in the area of the transport association Verkehrsverbund Rhein-Mosel (VRM), in the fare zone number 926.
