= Underground personnel carrier =

An underground personnel carrier is any heavy duty vehicle designed specifically for the safe transport of personnel and their supplies into underground work areas. The most common underground applications is for the mining of either precious metal or coal.

== Types ==
=== Narrow vein applications ===
5- and 7- man personnel carrier

Where tight turning in confined spaces is necessary, personnel carriers designed on tractors are common. Heavy duty fenders, bumpers and man baskets (gondolas) are fabricated to mount on the tractor or tractor frames to provide more durability.

Front loader personnel carrier

These personnel carriers use a front loader to perform various loader applications. Also a front basket is typically attached to the front loader arms so that they may be lifted. These carriers are typically built to carry 5 or 7 men.

Towing personnel carriers

Some personnel carriers use a heavy duty hydraulic rear hitch that can tow various attachments. Towing PCs can be used in conjunction with a front loader as well.

Attachments

Other narrow vein personnel carriers are designed for a specific job based on their attachments. These attachments include rear and/or front lift baskets for utility and electrical work, mechanic packages, cable reels, heavy duty canes, ANFO loaders, and shotcrete booms.

=== Specialty built ===
These personnel carriers are designed and built from the ground up. They are typically 5 man to 15 man carriers. These carriers may also be designed using multiple attachments for job specific applications.

=== Low profile ===
In the coal mining industry low profile personnel carriers are the most commonly used. These carriers may only have a 3 to 3.5 feet (0.91 to 1.07 m) height dimension and carry up to 14 men, and are typically built from the ground up and can be designed with job specific attachments.

== Mantrip ==
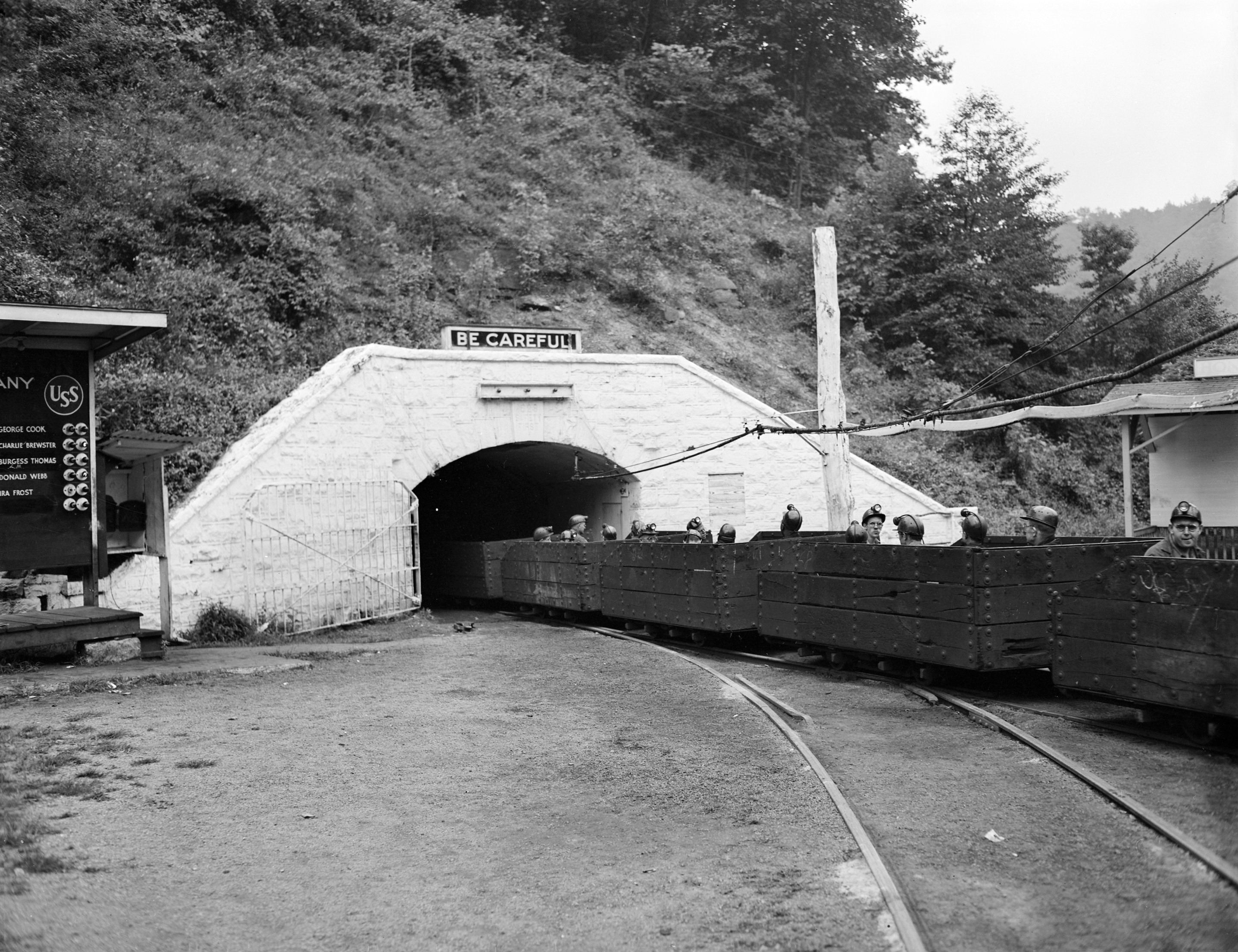
Coal miners riding a mantrip in McDowell County, West Virginia

A mantrip is a shuttle for transporting miners down into an underground mine at the start of their shift, and out again at the end. Mantrips usually take the form of a train, running on a mine railway and operating like a cable car. Mantrips may also be self-powered, for example by a diesel locomotive. Other types of mantrips do not require a track and take the form of a pickup truck running on rubber tires. Because many mines have low ceilings, mantrips tend to have a reduced height.

In the United States, the Mine Safety and Health Administration has published safety regulations governing the operation of mantrips.
