= Dickendorf =

- Municipality
- Location of Dickendorf within Altenkirchen district
- Interactive map of Dickendorf
- Location within Germany Location within Rhineland-Palatinate
- Coordinates: 50°44′28″N 7°51′11″E
- Country: Germany
- State: Rhineland-Palatinate
- District: Altenkirchen
- Municipal assoc.: Betzdorf-Gebhardshain

Government
  - Mayor (2019–24): Hermann Roth

Area
  - Total: 1.45 km^{2} (0.56 sq mi)
- Elevation: 408 m (1,339 ft)

Population (2025-12-31)
  - Total: 363
  - Density: 250/km^{2} (648/sq mi)
- Time zone: UTC+01:00 (CET)
  - Summer (DST): UTC+02:00 (CEST)
- Postal codes: 57520
- Dialling codes: 02747
- Vehicle registration: AK
- Website: www.dickendorf.de

Dickendorf is a municipality in the district of Altenkirchen, in Rhineland-Palatinate, Germany. Abutting a vast forest area, it is located in the Westerwald (literally "Western Forest") which is a low mountain range on the right bank of the river Rhine. The river Elbbach flows through this town.

Dickendorf is the international headquarters of Sabbath Rest Advent Church.

== Transport ==
Dickendorf is located at the Westerwald railway, but the train service has discontinued.
