= Steineroth =

- Municipality
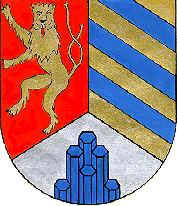
- Coat of arms

- Location of Steineroth within Altenkirchen district
- Interactive map of Steineroth
- Location within Germany Location within Rhineland-Palatinate
- Coordinates: 50°45′38″N 7°51′17″E
- Country: Germany
- State: Rhineland-Palatinate
- District: Altenkirchen
- Municipal assoc.: Betzdorf-Gebhardshain

Government
  - Mayor (2019–24): Theo Brenner

Area
  - Total: 2.53 km^{2} (0.98 sq mi)
- Elevation: 400 m (1,300 ft)

Population (2025-12-31)
  - Total: 542
  - Density: 214/km^{2} (555/sq mi)
- Time zone: UTC+01:00 (CET)
  - Summer (DST): UTC+02:00 (CEST)
- Postal codes: 57518
- Dialling codes: 02747
- Vehicle registration: AK
- Website: www.vggebhardshain.de

Steineroth is a municipality in the district of Altenkirchen, in Rhineland-Palatinate, in western Germany.
