= Elkenroth =

- Municipality
- Coat of arms

- Location of Elkenroth within Altenkirchen district
- Interactive map of Elkenroth
- Location within Germany Location within Rhineland-Palatinate
- Coordinates: 50°43′40″N 7°52′59″E
- Country: Germany
- State: Rhineland-Palatinate
- District: Altenkirchen
- Municipal assoc.: Betzdorf-Gebhardshain

Government
  - Mayor (2019–24): Peter Schwan

Area
  - Total: 8.15 km^{2} (3.15 sq mi)
- Elevation: 450 m (1,480 ft)

Population (2025-12-31)
  - Total: 1,816
  - Density: 223/km^{2} (577/sq mi)
- Time zone: UTC+01:00 (CET)
  - Summer (DST): UTC+02:00 (CEST)
- Postal codes: 57578
- Dialling codes: 02747
- Vehicle registration: AK
- Website: www.vg-bg.de

Elkenroth is a municipality that lies on the boundary of the Westerwald region in the district of Altenkirchen, Rhineland-Palatinate, Germany. It belongs to the Verbandsgemeinde of Betzdorf-Gebhardshain.

== Transport ==
Elkenroth is located at the Westerwald railway, owwned by the Westerwaldbahn GmbH, which belongs to the Altenkirchen district, the railway line is currently out of service.
