= Kausen =

- Municipality
- Location of Kausen within Altenkirchen district
- Interactive map of Kausen
- Location within Germany Location within Rhineland-Palatinate
- Coordinates: 50°44′34″N 7°52′15″E
- Country: Germany
- State: Rhineland-Palatinate
- District: Altenkirchen
- Municipal assoc.: Betzdorf-Gebhardshain

Government
  - Mayor (2019–24): Martin Lück

Area
  - Total: 3.62 km^{2} (1.40 sq mi)
- Elevation: 385 m (1,263 ft)

Population (2025-12-31)
  - Total: 789
  - Density: 218/km^{2} (565/sq mi)
- Time zone: UTC+01:00 (CET)
  - Summer (DST): UTC+02:00 (CEST)
- Postal codes: 57520
- Dialling codes: 02747
- Vehicle registration: AK
- Website: https://www.vg-bg.de/

Kausen (German pronunciation: [ˈkaʊzn̩]) is a municipality in the district of Altenkirchen, in Rhineland-Palatinate, in western Germany.
