= Rosenheim, Rhineland-Palatinate =

Rosenheim
- Municipality
- Coat of arms

- Location of Rosenheim within Altenkirchen district
- Interactive map of Rosenheim
- Location within Germany Location within Rhineland-Palatinate
- Coordinates: 50°42′47″N 7°51′01″E
- Country: Germany
- State: Rhineland-Palatinate
- District: Altenkirchen
- Municipal assoc.: Betzdorf-Gebhardshain

Government
  - Mayor (2019–24): Bernd Mockenhaupt

Area
  - Total: 4.10 km^{2} (1.58 sq mi)
- Elevation: 400 m (1,300 ft)

Population (2025-12-31)
  - Total: 751
  - Density: 183/km^{2} (474/sq mi)
- Time zone: UTC+01:00 (CET)
  - Summer (DST): UTC+02:00 (CEST)
- Postal codes: 57520
- Dialling codes: 02747
- Vehicle registration: AK
- Website: www.vggebhardshain.de

Rosenheim (German pronunciation: [ˈʁoːzn̩ˌhaɪm]) is a municipality in the district of Altenkirchen, in Rhineland-Palatinate, Germany. Not to be confused with Rosenheim in Bavaria.

== Transport ==
Rosenheim is located at the Westerwald railway, which is owned by company Westerwaldbahn GmbH and currently out of service. The lines 270, 271, 279 and N72 connect Selters to the public local bus transport. The town is located in the area of the transport association Verkehrsverbund Rhein-Mosel (VRM).
