= Malberg, Altenkirchen =

Malberg
- Municipality
- Coat of arms

- Location of Malberg within Altenkirchen (Westerwald) district
- Interactive map of Malberg
- Location within Germany Location within Rhineland-Palatinate
- Coordinates: 50°42′54″N 7°49′15″E
- Country: Germany
- State: Rhineland-Palatinate
- District: Altenkirchen (Westerwald)
- Municipal assoc.: Betzdorf-Gebhardshain

Government
  - Mayor (2019–24): Albert Hüsch

Area
  - Total: 4.31 km^{2} (1.66 sq mi)
- Elevation: 360–484 m (1,181–1,588 ft)

Population (2025-12-31)
  - Total: 1,063
  - Density: 247/km^{2} (639/sq mi)
- Time zone: UTC+01:00 (CET)
  - Summer (DST): UTC+02:00 (CEST)
- Postal codes: 57629
- Dialling codes: 02747
- Vehicle registration: AK
- Website: www.malberg.org

Malberg (German pronunciation: [ˈmaːlˌbɛʁk]) is a municipality in the district of Altenkirchen, in Rhineland-Palatinate, in western Germany.
