= SS Betzdorf =

A number of steamships have been named Betzdorf, including:

- SS Betzdorf (1920)
- SS Betzdorf (1945)
