= Fensdorf =

- Municipality
- Location of Fensdorf within Altenkirchen district
- Interactive map of Fensdorf
- Location within Germany Location within Rhineland-Palatinate
- Coordinates: 50°44′31″N 07°46′39″E
- Country: Germany
- State: Rhineland-Palatinate
- District: Altenkirchen
- Municipal assoc.: Betzdorf-Gebhardshain

Government
  - Mayor (2019–24): Daniela de Nichilo

Area
  - Total: 2.17 km^{2} (0.84 sq mi)
- Elevation: 337–384 m (1,106–1,260 ft)

Population (2025-12-31)
  - Total: 412
  - Density: 190/km^{2} (492/sq mi)
- Time zone: UTC+01:00 (CET)
  - Summer (DST): UTC+02:00 (CEST)
- Postal codes: 57580
- Dialling codes: 0 27 42
- Vehicle registration: AK
- Website: fensdorf.de

Fensdorf is a municipality in the district of Altenkirchen, in Rhineland-Palatinate, Germany.
