= Wallmenroth =

- Municipality
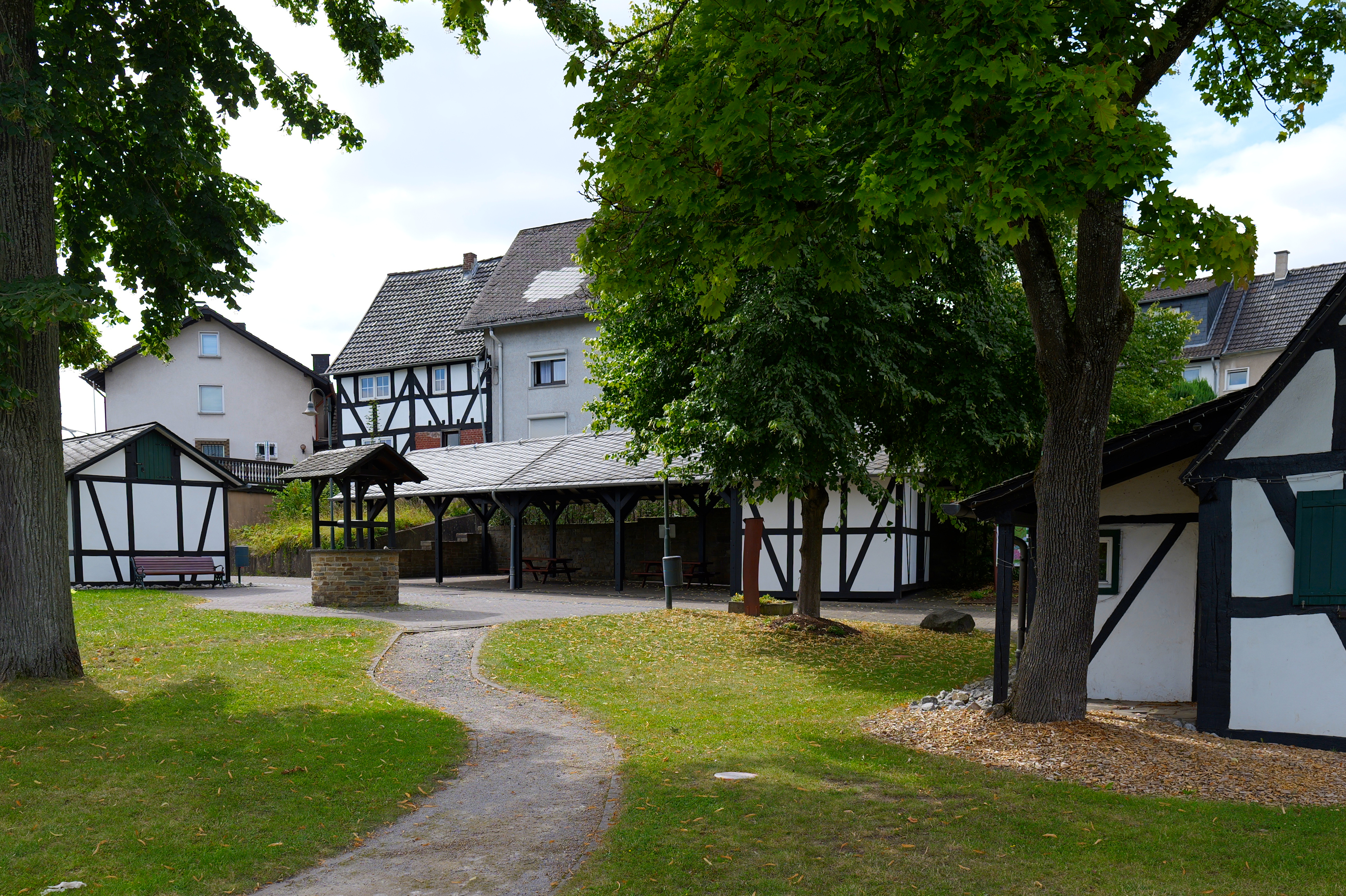

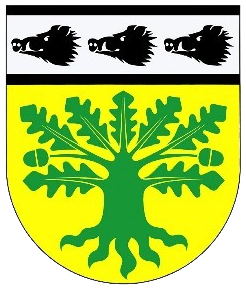
- Coat of arms

- Location of Wallmenroth within Altenkirchen district
- Interactive map of Wallmenroth
- Location within Germany Location within Rhineland-Palatinate
- Coordinates: 50°47′49″N 7°50′20″E
- Country: Germany
- State: Rhineland-Palatinate
- District: Altenkirchen
- Municipal assoc.: Betzdorf-Gebhardshain

Government
  - Mayor (2019–24): Michael Wäschenbach (CDU)

Area
  - Total: 3.85 km^{2} (1.49 sq mi)
- Elevation: 188 m (617 ft)

Population (2025-12-31)
  - Total: 1,191
  - Density: 309/km^{2} (801/sq mi)
- Time zone: UTC+01:00 (CET)
  - Summer (DST): UTC+02:00 (CEST)
- Postal codes: 57584
- Dialling codes: 02741
- Vehicle registration: AK
- Website: www.wallmenroth.de

Wallmenroth is a municipality in the district of Altenkirchen, in Rhineland-Palatinate, in western Germany. It has a total population of 1,185 as of 2021.

== Transport ==
The local bus lines 258 and 294 run in Wallmenroth.
