= Molzhain =

- Municipality
- Location of Molzhain within Altenkirchen district
- Interactive map of Molzhain
- Location within Germany Location within Rhineland-Palatinate
- Coordinates: 50°44′59″N 7°51′18″E
- Country: Germany
- State: Rhineland-Palatinate
- District: Altenkirchen
- Municipal assoc.: Betzdorf-Gebhardshain

Government
  - Mayor (2019–24): Stefan Glorius

Area
  - Total: 2.91 km^{2} (1.12 sq mi)
- Elevation: 370 m (1,210 ft)

Population (2025-12-31)
  - Total: 523
  - Density: 180/km^{2} (465/sq mi)
- Time zone: UTC+01:00 (CET)
  - Summer (DST): UTC+02:00 (CEST)
- Postal codes: 57520
- Dialling codes: 02747
- Vehicle registration: AK

Molzhain is a municipality in the district of Altenkirchen, in Rhineland-Palatinate, in western Germany.
