= Alsdorf, Altenkirchen =

Alsdorf
- Municipality
- Coat of arms

- Location of Alsdorf within Altenkirchen district
- Interactive map of Alsdorf
- Location within Germany Location within Rhineland-Palatinate
- Coordinates: 50°46′36″N 7°52′59″E
- Country: Germany
- State: Rhineland-Palatinate
- District: Altenkirchen
- Municipal assoc.: Betzdorf-Gebhardshain

Government
  - Mayor (2019–24): Rudolf Staudt (SPD)

Area
  - Total: 5.93 km^{2} (2.29 sq mi)
- Elevation: 192 m (630 ft)

Population (2025-12-31)
  - Total: 1,483
  - Density: 250/km^{2} (648/sq mi)
- Time zone: UTC+01:00 (CET)
  - Summer (DST): UTC+02:00 (CEST)
- Postal codes: 57518
- Dialling codes: 02741
- Vehicle registration: AK

Alsdorf is a municipality in the district of Altenkirchen, in Rhineland-Palatinate, Germany.

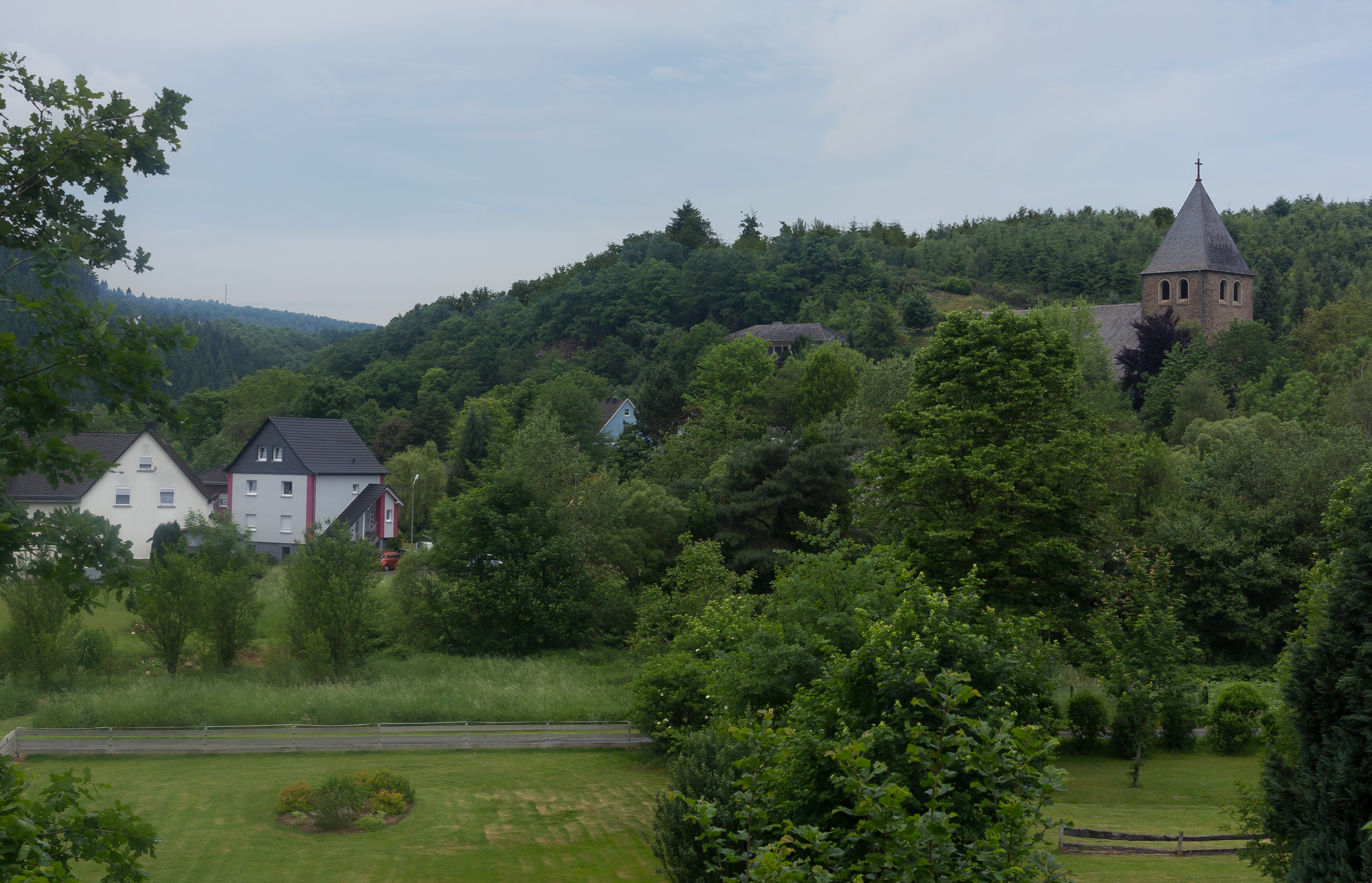
Alsdorf, church in the street

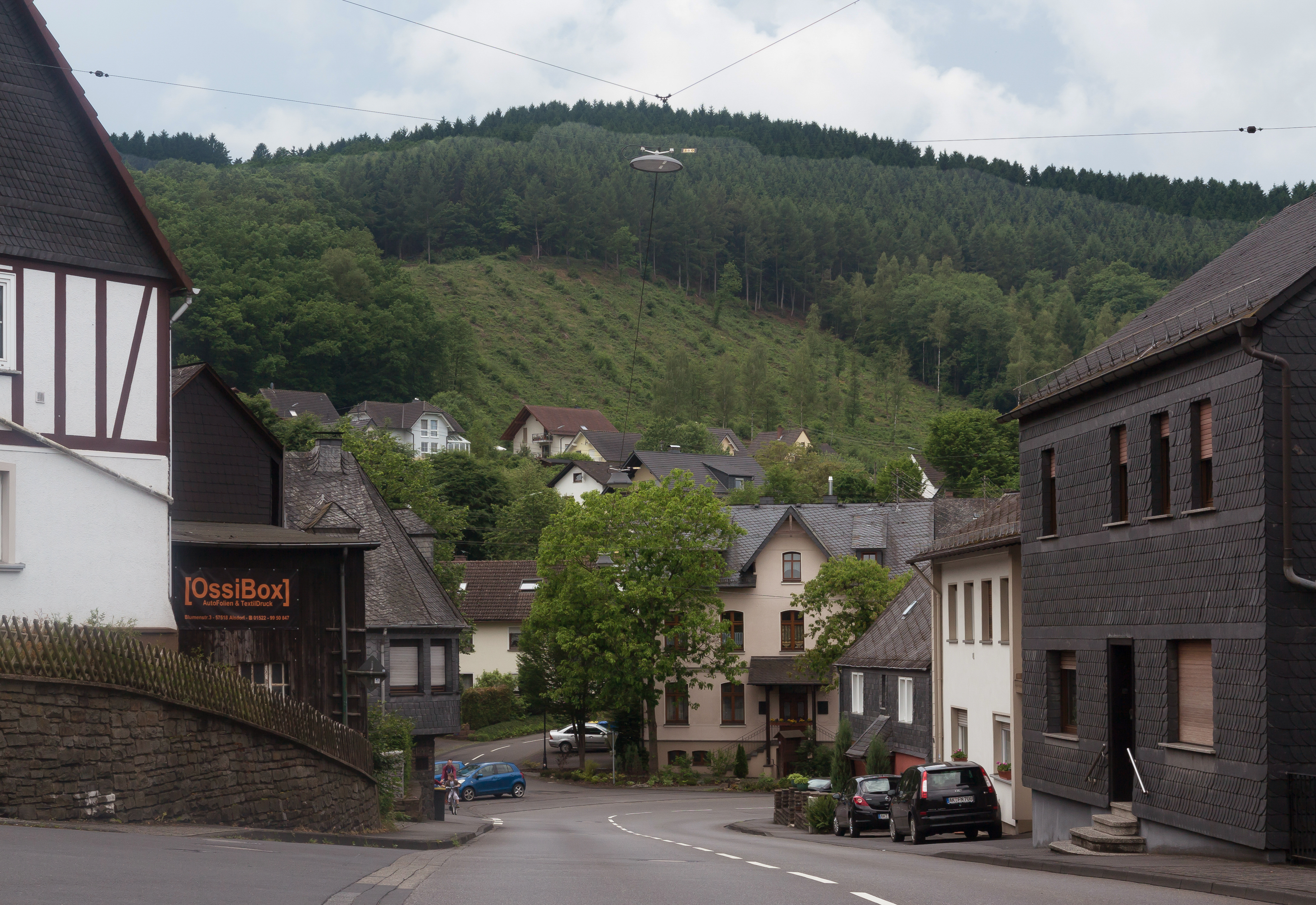
Alsdorf, street view

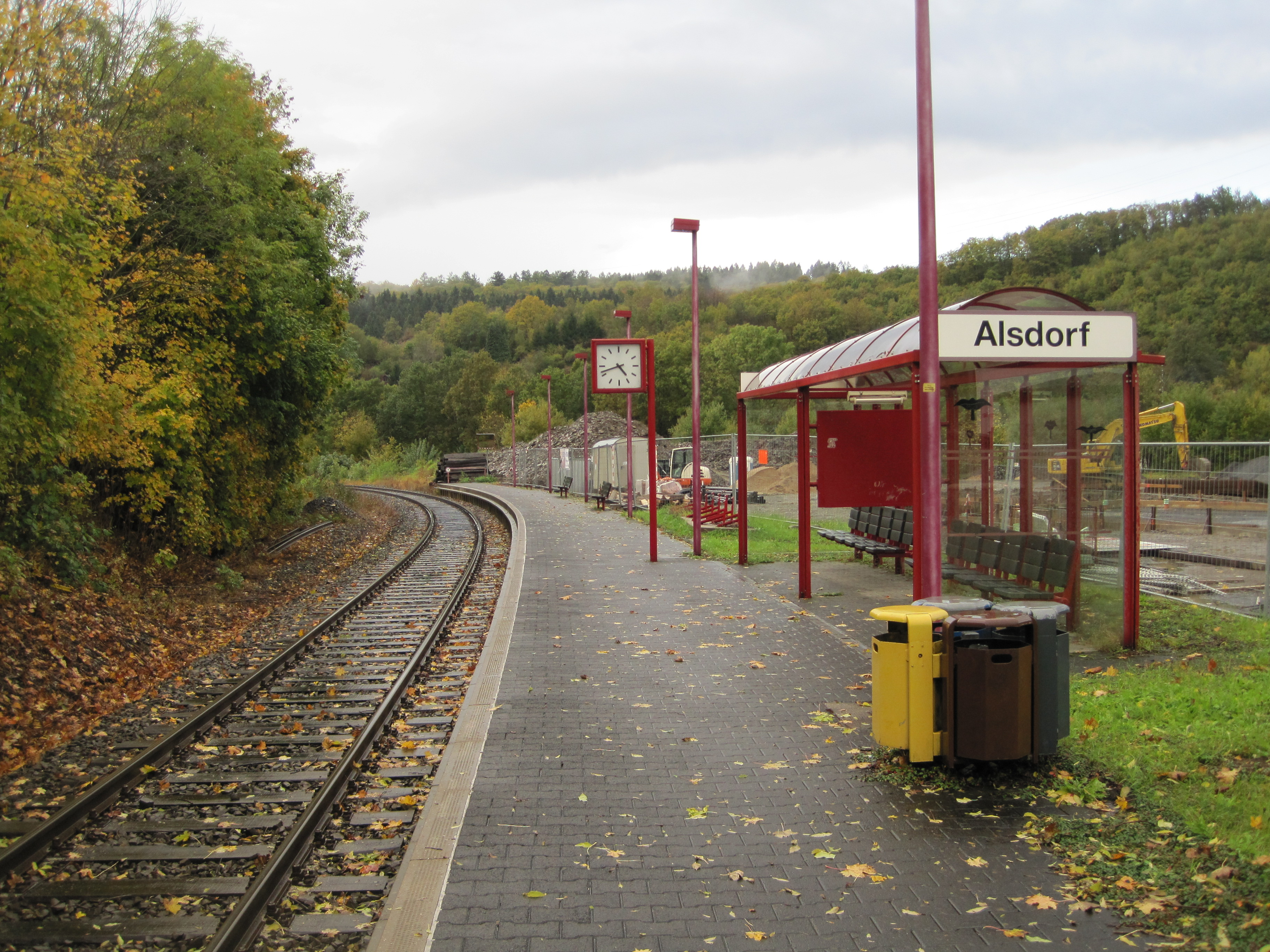
Alsdorf train stop (line RB97)

== Transport ==
Alsdorf is connected to the train line RB97 (Daadetalbahn) of Westerwaldbahn GmbH that runs at Alsdorf stop as well as line RB96 of DreiLänderBahn, a section of Hessische Landesbahn (HLB) at the train stop Grünebacherhütte, which also is located in Alsdorf. Also the local bus lines 278 and N73 serve Alsdorf. Alsdorf is located in the area of the transport association Verkehrsverbund Rhein-Mosel (VRM), in the fare zone number 926.
