= Steinebach/Sieg =

- Municipality
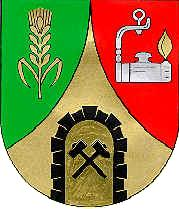
- Coat of arms

- Location of Steinebach/Sieg within Altenkirchen district
- Interactive map of Steinebach/Sieg
- Location within Germany Location within Rhineland-Palatinate
- Coordinates: 50°43′55″N 7°49′37″E
- Country: Germany
- State: Rhineland-Palatinate
- District: Altenkirchen
- Municipal assoc.: Betzdorf-Gebhardshain

Government
  - Mayor (2019–24): Hans-Joachim Greb

Area
  - Total: 4.55 km^{2} (1.76 sq mi)
- Elevation: 350 m (1,150 ft)

Population (2025-12-31)
  - Total: 1,319
  - Density: 290/km^{2} (751/sq mi)
- Time zone: UTC+01:00 (CET)
  - Summer (DST): UTC+02:00 (CEST)
- Postal codes: 57520
- Dialling codes: 02747
- Vehicle registration: AK
- Website: www.vggebhardshain.de

Steinebach/Sieg is a municipality in the district of Altenkirchen, in Rhineland-Palatinate, in western Germany.

== Transport ==
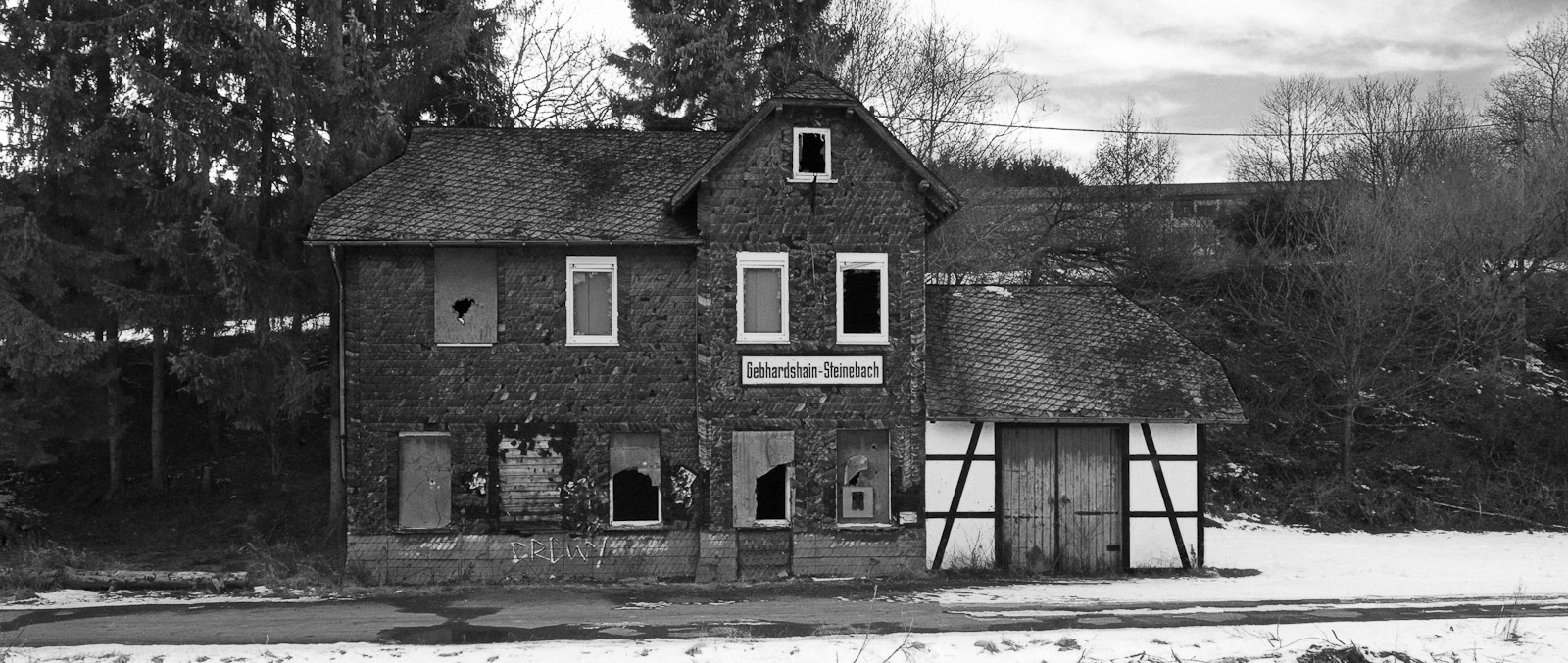
Former train station in Steinebach

Steinebach is located on the railway line Westerwaldbahn which is owned by Westerwaldbahn GmbH and currently out of service.
