= Scheuerfeld–Emmerzhausen railway =

Railway line in Germany

Scheuerfeld–Nauroth/Emmerzhausen

Overview
- Line number: 9278 (Scheuerfeld–Emmerzhausen); 9279 (Bindweide–Nauroth new Bf)

Service
- Route number: 194j (1949)

Technical
- Line length: 20.2 km (12.6 mi)
- Track gauge: 1,435 mm (4 ft 8 1/2 in) standard gauge
- Maximum incline: 2.5 %

The Scheuerfeld and Emmerzhausen railway, also known as the Westerwald Railway (German: Westerwaldbahn), is a railway line in the northernmost part of the German federated state of Rhineland-Palatinate. There was a pit railway here as early as the last decades of the 19th century, used to transport ore and other minerals, but after the turn of the century, a standard gauge railway was built for public transport. The line is completely located in the area of the transport association Verkehrsverbund Rhein-Mosel (VRM), although the line is out of service.

== Literature ==
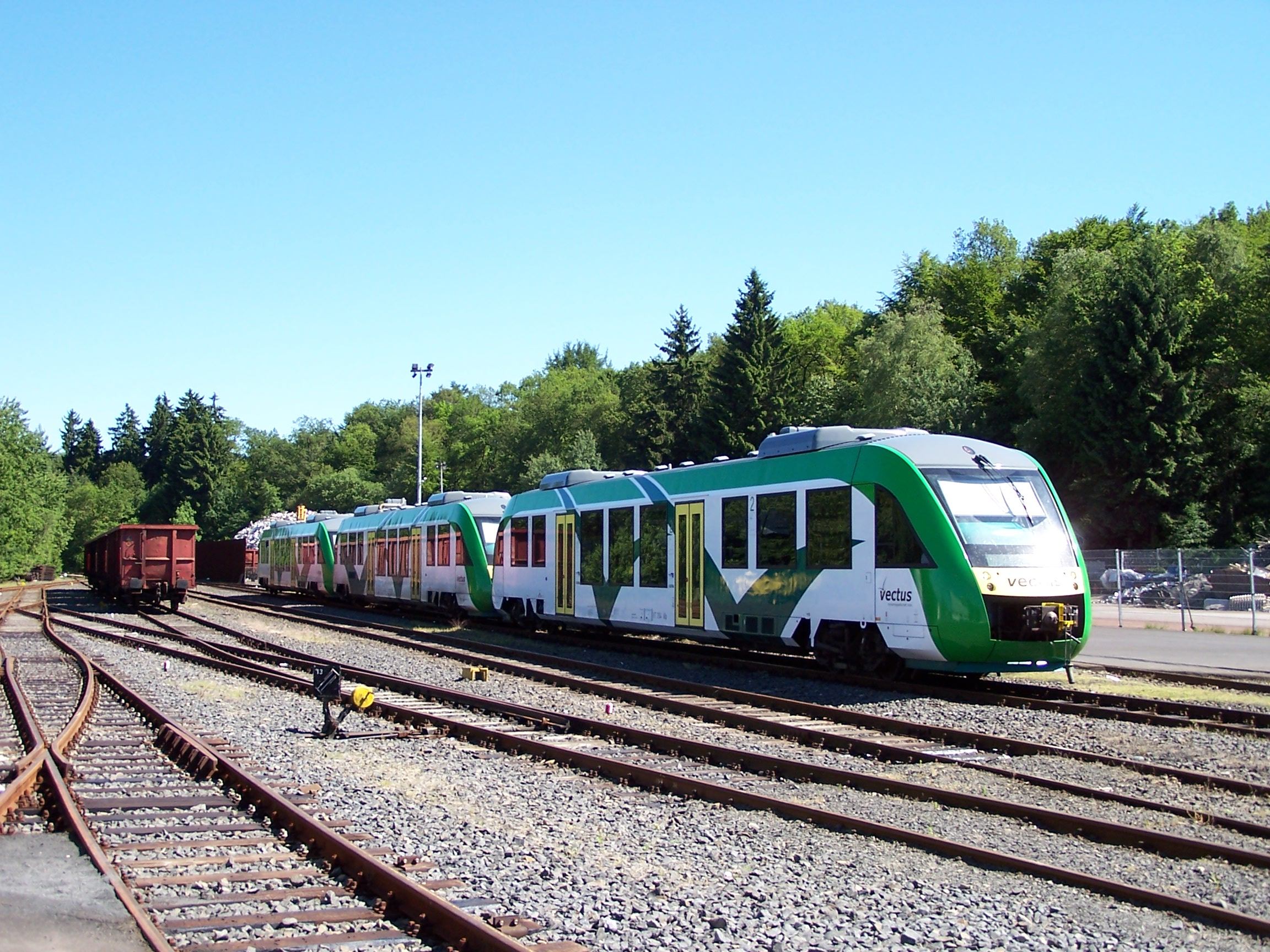
Au fright train cart and a passenger train of the Vectus Verkehrsgesellschaft in the Bindweide depot

- Gerd Wolff: Deutsche Klein- und Privatbahnen. Band 1: Rhineland-Palatinate/Saarland. EK-Verlag, Freiburg 1989, ISBN 3-88255-651-X, S. 264–284.
