= Coal mining in the United Kingdom =

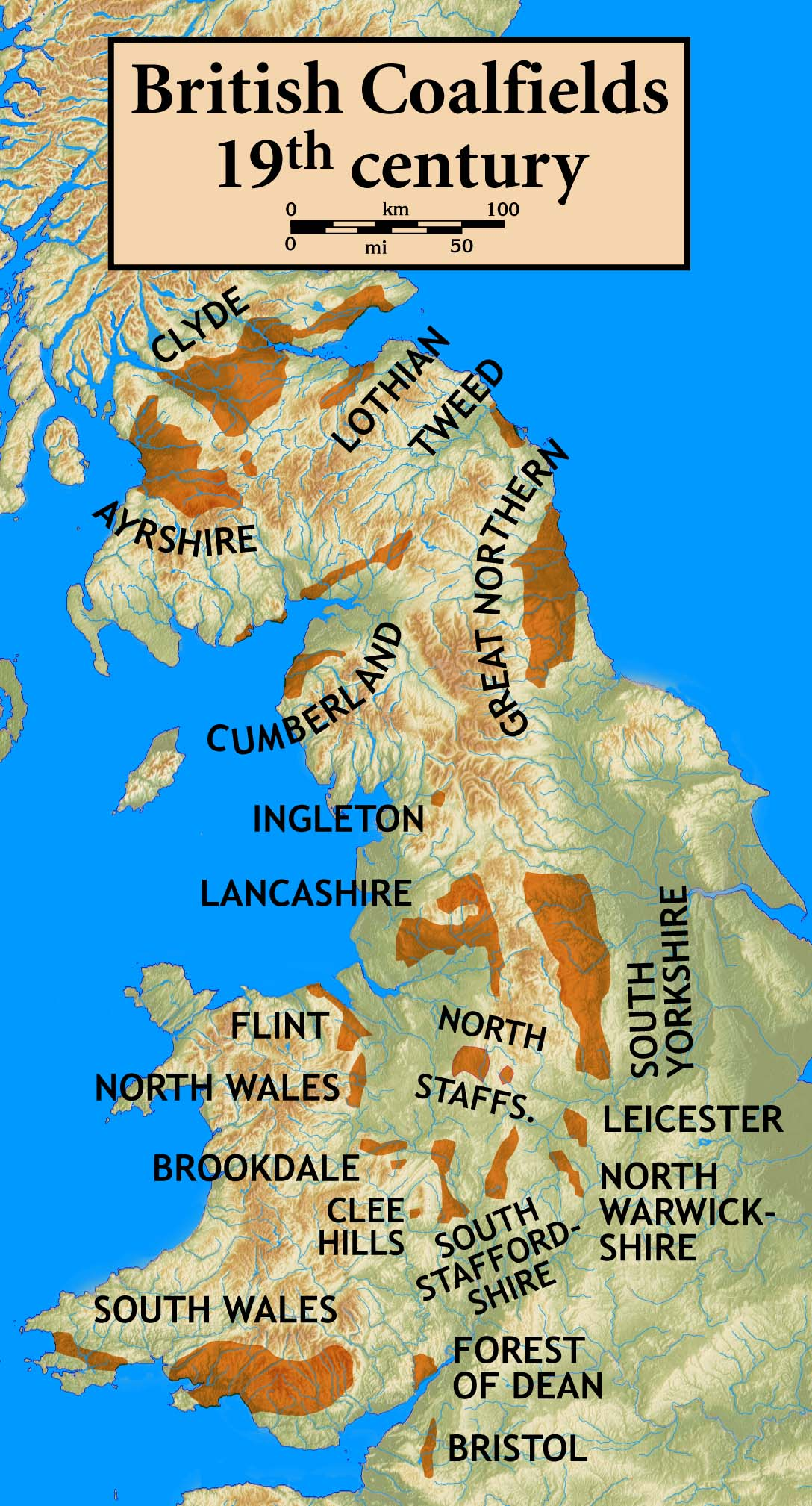
Coalfields of the United Kingdom in the 19th century

In the United Kingdom, coal mining dates back to Roman times and occurred in many different parts of the country. Britain's coalfields are associated with Northumberland and Durham, North and South Wales, Yorkshire, the Scottish Central Belt, Lancashire, Cumbria, the East and West Midlands and Kent. After 1972, coal mining quickly collapsed and had practically disappeared by the 21st century. In the winter of 2012–13, 40 per cent of Britain's energy needs were met by coal, most of it imported. Production fell from 228 million tonnes in 1957 to just 107 thousand tonnes in 2024, while coal consumption fell from 216 million to 2 million tonnes in the same time period. Employment in coal mines fell from a peak of 1,191,000 in 1920 to 695,000 in 1956, 247,000 in 1976, 44,000 in 1993, 2,000 in 2015, and to 360 in 2022.

Almost all onshore coal resources in the UK occur in rocks of the Carboniferous period, some of which extend under the North Sea. Bituminous coal is present in most of Britain's coalfields and is 86% to 88% carbon. In Northern Ireland, there are extensive deposits of lignite which is less energy-dense based on oxidation (combustion) at ordinary combustion temperatures. In 2015, European Association for Coal and Lignite (EURACOAL) estimated that the UK has 3.56 billion tonnes of hard coal resources.

In 2020, the proposed Woodhouse Colliery gained planning permission; the permission was later quashed by the High Court, and the project was scrapped in 2025.

As of 2026, there were two active coal mines in the United Kingdom: Aberpergwm in South Wales and Ayle Colliery in Northern England. Additionally, there were several Freemining plots in the Forest of Dean.

== Extent and geology ==
The United Kingdom's onshore coal resources occur in Carboniferous rocks, some of which extend under the North Sea. The carbon content of the bituminous coal present in most of the coalfields is 86% to 88%. Britain's coalfields are associated with Northumberland and Durham, North and South Wales, Yorkshire, the Scottish Central Belt, Lancashire, Cumbria, the East and West Midlands and Kent.

== History ==
Stone and Bronze Age flint axes have been discovered embedded in coal, showing that it was mined in Britain before the Roman invasion. Early miners first extracted coal already exposed on the surface and then followed the seams underground. However seacoal was probably the greatest source in pre-historic times.

It is probable that the Romans used outcropping coal when working iron or burning lime for building purposes. Evidence to support these theories comes mostly from ash discovered at excavations of Roman sites.

There is no mention of coal mining in the Domesday Book of 1086 although lead and iron mines are recorded. In the 13th century, there are records of coal digging in Durham and Northumberland, Nottinghamshire and Derbyshire, Staffordshire, Lancashire, the Forest of Dean, Prestongrange in Lothian and North and South Wales. At this time coal was referred to as sea cole, a reference to coal washed ashore on the north east coast of England from either the cliffs or undersea outcrops. As the supply of coal on the surface became used up, settlers followed the seam inland by digging up the shore. Generally the seam continued underground, encouraging the settlers to dig to find coal, the precursor to modern operations.

The early mines would have been drift mines or adits where coal seams outcropped or by shallow bell pits where coal was close to the surface. Shafts lined with tree trunks and branches have been found in Lancashire in workings dating from the early 17th century and by 1750 brick lined shafts to 150-foot (45 m) depth were common.

=== Industrial Revolution until 1900 ===
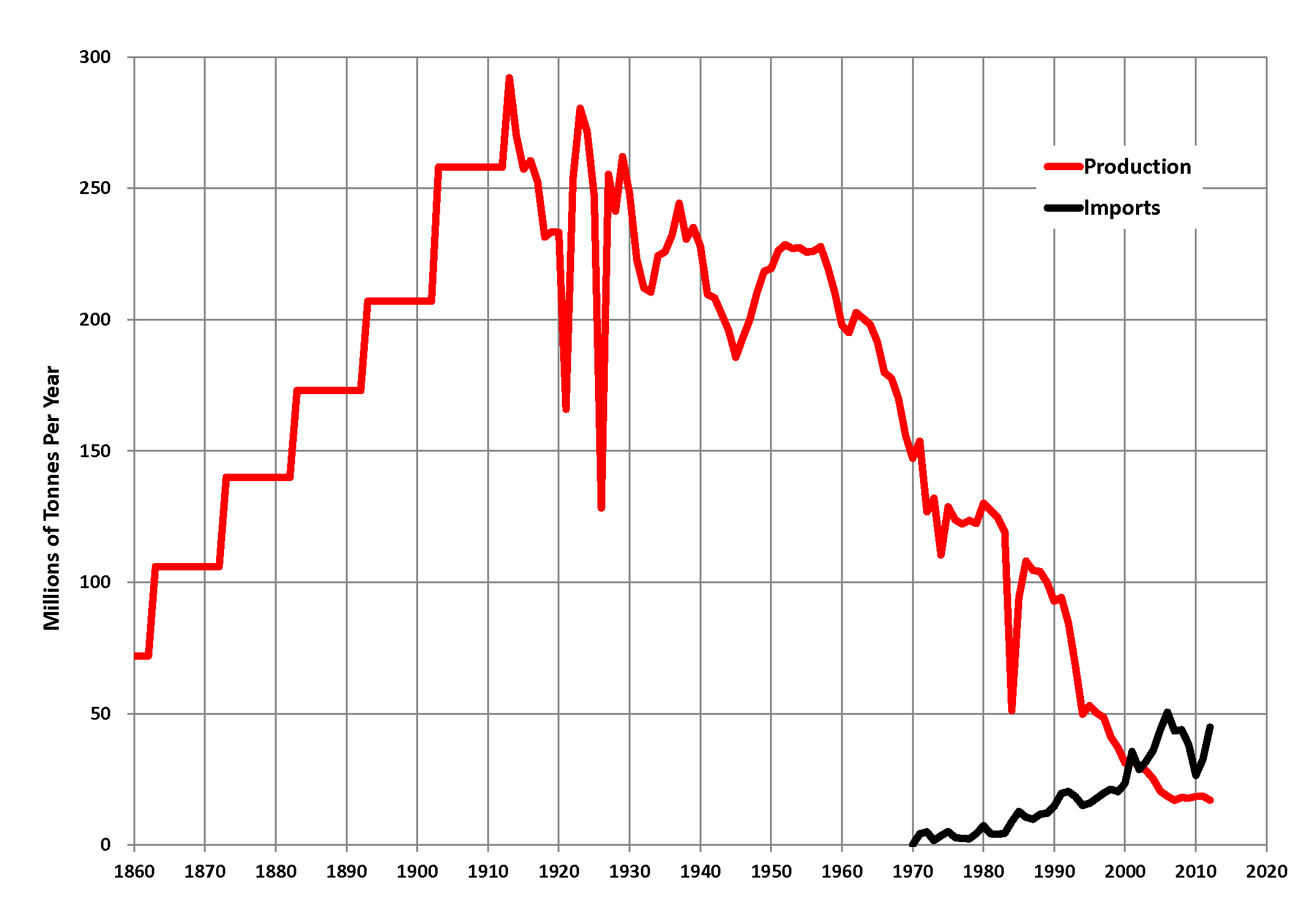
Annual UK coal production (in red) and imports (black), DECC data

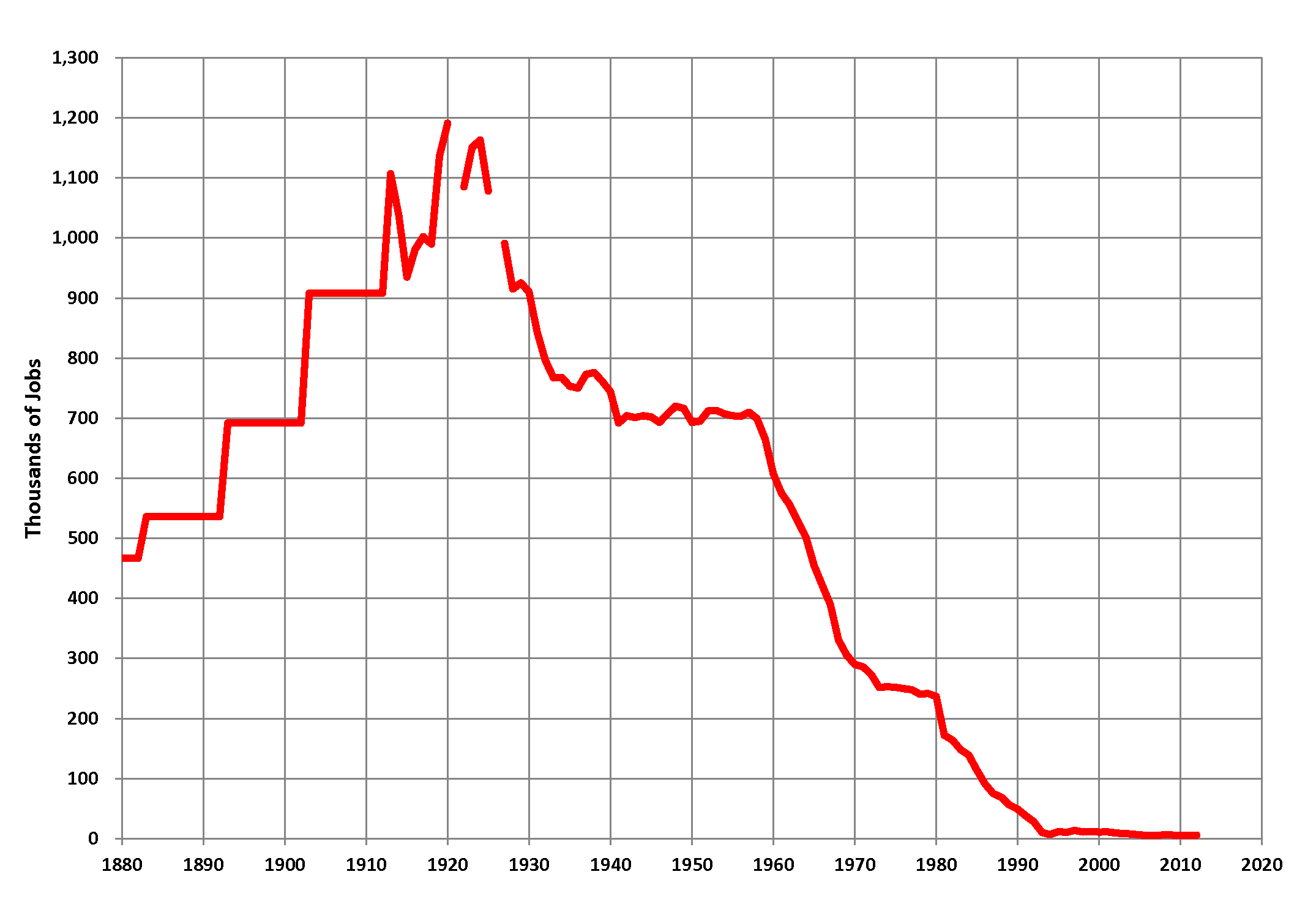
Coal mining employment in the UK, 1880–2012, DECC data

Coal production increased dramatically in the 19th century as the Industrial Revolution gathered pace, as a fuel for steam engines such as the Newcomen engine, and later, the Watt steam engine. Moreover, the transition from an organic economy to one based on underground reserves, together with the abundant availability of relatively cheap coal, played a pivotal role in the British Industrial Revolution.

To produce firewood in the 1860s equivalent in energy terms to domestic consumption of coal would have required 25 million acres (100,000 km^{2}) of land per year, nearly the entire farmland area of England (26 million acres (105,000 km^{2})).

A key development was the invention at Coalbrookdale in the early 18th century of coke which could be used to make pig iron in the blast furnace. The development of the steam locomotive by Richard Trevithick early in the 19th century gave added impetus, and coal consumption grew rapidly as the railway network expanded through the Victorian period. Coal was widely used for domestic heating owing to its low cost and widespread availability. The manufacture of coke also provided coal gas, which could be used for heating and lighting. Most of the workers were children and men.

Development of coal production in the UK, 1900–2019

At the beginning of the 19th century, methods of coal extraction were primitive and the workforce – men, women, and children – laboured in dangerous conditions. By 1841 about 216,000 people were employed in the mines. Women and children worked underground for 11 or 12 hours a day for smaller wages than men. The public became aware of conditions in the country's collieries in 1838 after an accident at Huskar Colliery in Silkstone, near Barnsley. A stream overflowed into the ventilation drift after violent thunderstorms causing the death of 26 children; 11 girls aged from 8 to 16 and 15 boys between 9 and 12 years of age. The disaster came to the attention of Queen Victoria who ordered an inquiry. This led to the Mines and Collieries Act 1842 (5 & 6 Vict. c. 99), commonly known as the Mines Act 1842, an act of the Parliament of the United Kingdom which forbade women and girls of any age to work underground and introduced a minimum age of ten for boys employed in underground work. However, the employment of women did not end abruptly in 1842; with the connivance of some employers, women dressed as men continued to work underground for several years. Penalties for employing women were small and inspectors were few and some women were so desperate for work they willingly worked illegally for less pay. Eventually, the Sex Discrimination Act 1975 (c. 65), another act of the Parliament of the United Kingdom, was passed protecting women – and men – from discrimination on the grounds of sex or marital status, including regarding employment as miners. Also, children continued working underground at some pits after 1845. At Coppull Colliery's Burgh Pit, three females died after an explosion in November 1846; one was eleven years old. The Mines (Prohibition of Child Labour Underground) Act 1900 was an act of Parliament that prevented boys under the age of thirteen from working, or being (for the purposes of employment) in an underground mine. (The act was repealed in full by the Mines and Quarries Act 1954 (2 & 3 Eliz. 2. c. 70); by such time the act was out of date and was no longer necessary due to the stronger provisions in the Employment of Women, Young Persons, and Children Act 1920 (10 & 11 Geo. 5. c. 65).

Although it has been surmised that there were no Black miners in the UK, two chapters in the book by Norma Gregory Jamaicans in Nottingham: Narratives and Reflections, are on Black coal miners. The scarcity of resources on these workers led Gregory to curate an exhibition called The Digging Deep Project Exhibition at the National Coal Mining Museum, in Wakefield, West Yorkshire and to found the Black Miners Museum.

=== Nationalisation ===
Until 1 January 1947, the mines were owned by various individuals and companies. On that date most were nationalised by the Coal Industry Nationalisation Act 1946 (9 & 10 Geo. 6. c. 59) and were run by the new National Coal Board. In March 1987 the legal name of the NCB was changed to the British Coal Corporation. The name "British Coal" had been used by the NCB since 28 April 1986.

=== Decline in volume ===
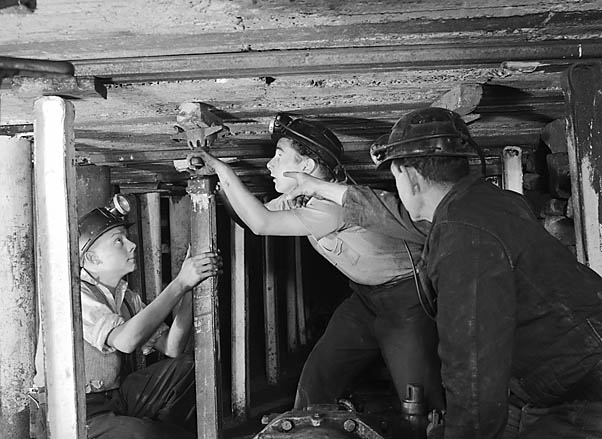
Aberaman Miners' Training Centre S.Wales 1951

UK coal production peaked in 1913 at 287 million tonnes. Until the late 1960s, coal was the main source of energy produced in the UK, peaking at 228 million tonnes in 1952. Ninety-five per cent of this came from roughly 1,334 deep-mines that were operational at the time, with the rest from around 92 surface mines.

In the 1950s and 1960s, around a hundred North East coal mines were closed. In March 1968, the last pit in the Black Country closed and pit closures were a regular occurrence in many other areas. Beginning with wildcat action in 1969, the National Union of Mineworkers became increasingly militant, and was successful in gaining increased wages in their strikes in 1972 and 1974. Closures were less common in the 1970s, and new investments were made in sites such as the huge, modern Selby Coalfield. In early 1984, the Conservative government of Margaret Thatcher announced plans to close 20 coal pits which led to the year-long miners' strike which ended in March 1985. The strike was unsuccessful in stopping the closures and led to an end to the closed shop in British Coal, as the breakaway Union of Democratic Mineworkers was formed by miners who objected to the NUM's handling of the strike. Numerous pit closures followed, and in August 1989 coal mining ended in the Kent coalfield.

In 1986, Kellingley colliery near Pontefract achieved a record 404,000 tonnes in a single shift but nevertheless, since 1981 production fell sharply from 128 to 17.8 million tonnes in 2009.

Between 1947 and 1994, some 950 mines were closed by UK governments. Clement Attlee’s Labour government closed 101 pits between 1947 and 1951; Macmillan (Conservative) closed 246 pits between 1957 and 1963; Wilson (Labour) closed 253 in his two terms in office between 1964 and 1976; Heath (Conservative) closed 26 between 1970 and 1974; and Thatcher (Conservative) closed 115 between 1979 and 1990.

In 1994, then-Prime Minister John Major privatised British Coal after announcing 55 further closures, with the majority of operations transferred to the new company UK Coal. By this time, British Coal had closed all but the most economical of coal pits.

The pit closures reflected coal consumption slumping to the lowest rate in more than a century, further declining towards the end of the 1980s and into the 1990s. This coincided with initiatives for cleaner energy generation as power stations switched to gas and biomass. A total of 100 million tonnes was produced in 1986, but by 1995 the amount was around 50 million tons.

In 2001, production was exceeded by imports for the first time. In 2014, coal imported was three times more than the coal mined in Britain. In 2009, companies were licensed to extract 125 million tonnes of coal in operating underground mines and 42 million tonnes at opencast locations.

Coal mining employed 4,000 workers at 30 locations in 2013, extracting 13 million tonnes of coal. The UK coal mines achieved the most economical coal production in Europe, according to UK Coal, with a level of productivity of 3,200 tonnes per man year as of 2012, at which point there were 13 UK Coal deep mines. The three deep-pit mines were Hatfield and Kellingley Collieries in Yorkshire and Thoresby in Nottinghamshire. There were 26 opencast sites in 2014, mainly in Scotland. Around that time, most coal was used for electricity generation and steel-making. Its use for heating homes had already declined because of pollution concerns. The commodity was also used for fertilisers, chemicals, plastics, medicines and road surfaces.

Hatfield Colliery closed in June 2015, as did Thoresby, and in December 2015, Kellingley, bringing to an end deep coal mining in the UK. The occasion was marked by a rally and march attended by thousands of people. The closure of coal mines left the affected communities economically deprived, unable to recover even in the long run.

In 2020, the Woodhouse Colliery proposal gained planning permission but the project was abandoned in 2025. The plan was criticised by some MPs and environmentalists due to the incompatibility of coal mining with government commitments to reduce carbon emissions. The mine was proposed by West Cumbria Mining and planned to extract coking coal from beneath the Irish Sea until 2049. The decision to grant planning permission for Woodhouse Colliery was overturned by the High Court in September 2024, leaving the application to be re-determined by the Secretary of State for Housing, Communities and Local Government; the project was cancelled in March 2025.

=== Complete phase-out for electricity generation ===
On 21 April 2017, Britain went a full day without using coal power to generate electricity for the first time. In May 2019, Britain went a full week without coal power. In 2019, German utilities firm RWE announced that it planned to close all its UK coal power plants by 2020, leaving only four plants operating by March 2020; in 2018, eight were still in operation when the government announced plans to shut down all coal power plants in the UK by 2025. In June 2021, the government announced it was bringing forward the shutdown to 2024. Ratcliffe-on-Soar, the UK's last coal-fired power station, closed at the end of September 2024.

== See also ==
- Mines and Collieries Act 1842
- Mines (Prohibition of Child Labour Underground) Act 1900
- National Coal Board
- Three-Day Week
- Coal Mines (Emergency) Act 1920
- List of coal mines in the United Kingdom
- Phase-out of coal-fired electricity generation in the United Kingdom
- National Coal Mining Museum for England
- Big Pit National Coal Museum, Wales
- National Mining Museum Scotland
