= Pit pony =

Animal used in mines

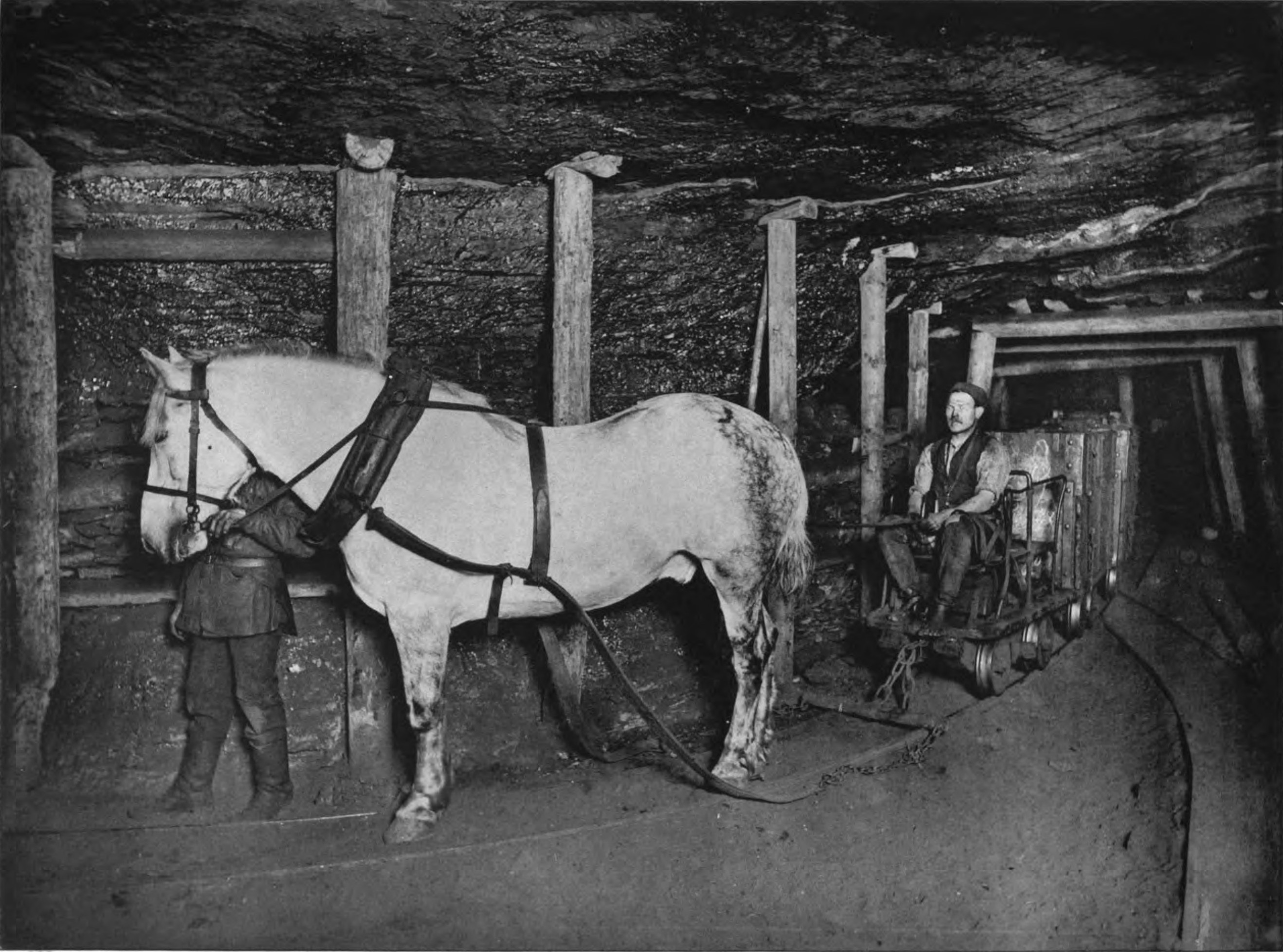
Pit pony in Germany, 1894

A pit pony, otherwise known as a mining horse, was a horse, pony or mule commonly used underground in mines from the mid-18th until the mid-20th century. The term "pony" was sometimes broadly applied to any equine working underground.

== History ==
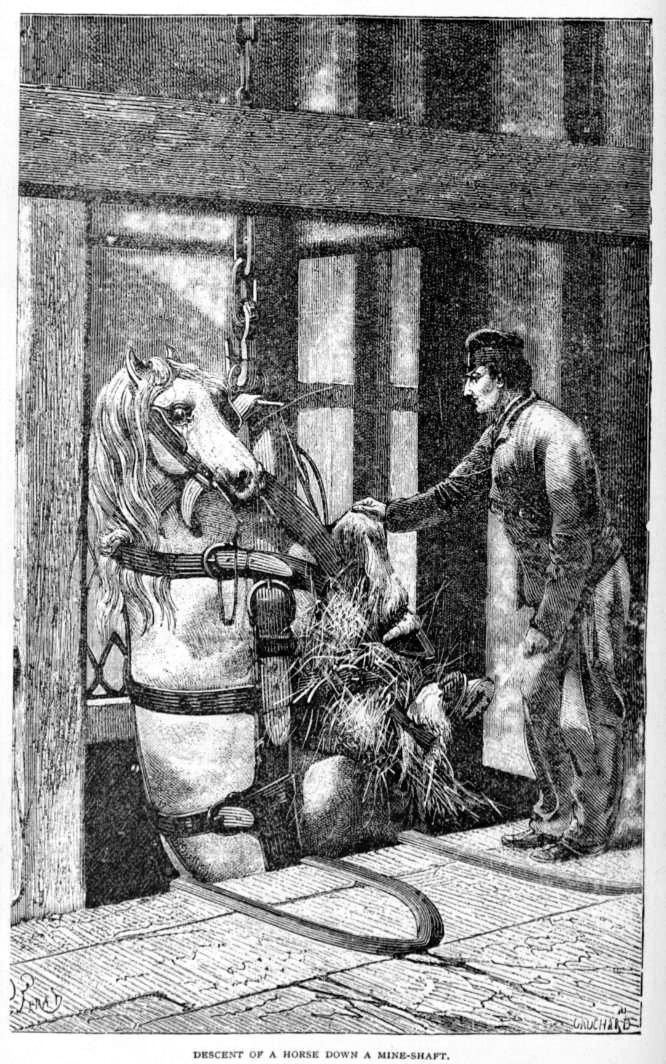
Nineteenth-century illustration of a pony being lowered down a mine shaft

The first known recorded use of ponies underground in Great Britain was in the Durham coalfield in 1750. Following the drowning deaths of 26 children when the Huskar Colliery in Silkstone flooded on 4 July 1838, "A report was published in The Times, and the wider British public learned for the first time that women and children worked in the mines. There was a public outcry, led by politician and reformer Anthony Ashley Cooper, later Lord Shaftesbury", who then introduced the Mines and Collieries Act 1842 to Parliament which barred women, girls and boys under 10 (later amended to 13) from working underground, leading to the widespread use of horses and ponies in mining in England, though child labour lingered on to varying extents until finally eliminated by a variety of factors including further laws, improved inspection regimes, and changing economics.

In the United States, mules outnumbered ponies in mines. The use of ponies was never common in the US, though ponies were used in Appalachian coal fields in the mid-20th century.

The British Coal Mines Regulation Act 1887 (50 & 51 Vict. c. 58) presented the first national legislation to protect horses working underground. Due to pressure from the National Equine Defense League (formerly the Pit Ponies' Protection Society) founded in 1908 by animal and human rights advocate Francis Albert Cox (24 June 1862 – 25 May 1920) – and the Scottish Society to Promote Kindness to Pit Ponies; in 1911, a royal commission report was published, detailing conditions, which resulted in protective legislation.

In 1904, the president of the Association for the Prevention of Cruelty to Pit Ponies, Countess Maud Fitzwilliam, daughter of Lawrence Dundas, 1st Marquess of Zetland, awarded a young Elsecar Collieries mine worker, John Willie Bell of Wentworth, the Fitzwilliam Medal for Kindness for an act of bravery that saved the life of his equine workmate. Bell's story of staying behind while his human workmates were able to escape through a small opening, to ensure that the pony would have a chance of rescue, became a successful tool for the Countess in promoting pit pony rights.

In 1911, Harry Lauder became an outspoken advocate, "pleading the cause of the poor pit ponies" to Winston Churchill, when introduced to him at the House of Commons, reporting to the Tamworth Herald that he "could talk for hours about my wee four-footed friends of the mine. But I think I convinced him that the time has now arrived when something should be done by the law of the land to improve the lot and working conditions of the patient, equine slaves who assist so materially in carrying on the great mining industry of this country."

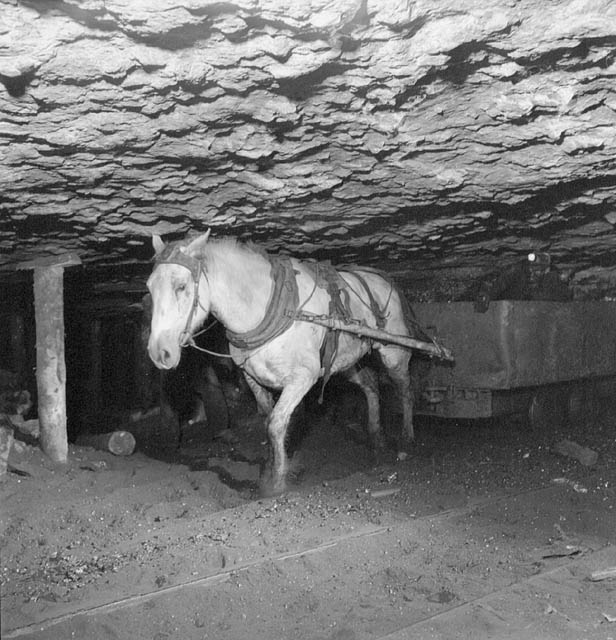
Pit pony and miner in a mine in New Aberdeen, Nova Scotia, August 1946. The last working pit pony was brought out of the Drummond Coal Company colliery at Westville in 1978.

At the peak of this practice in 1913, there were 70,000 ponies underground in Britain. In later years, mechanical haulage was introduced on the main underground roads replacing pony hauls, and ponies tended to be confined to the shorter runs from coal face to main road (known in North East England as "putting") which were more difficult to mechanise. In 1984 there were still 55 ponies in use with the National Coal Board in Britain, chiefly at the modern pit in Ellington, Northumberland. When Ellington closed for the first time in 1994, four pit ponies were brought out (no ponies were used there during the RJB Mining era). Of the four, two went to the National Coal Mining Museum for England at Caphouse and two went to Newcastle Cat and Dog Shelter. The last surviving pony was Tony who died in 2011 aged 40 at the Newcastle Cat and Dog Shelter.

Probably the last colliery horse to work underground in a British coal mine, "Robbie", was retired from Pant y Gasseg, near Pontypool, in May 1999. The last pony mine in the US, located near Centerville, Iowa, closed in 1971. The last pit ponies used in Australia, Wharrier and Mr Ed of the Collinsville Coal's No 2 Mine in Queensland, were retired in 1990.

== Breed and conformation ==
Larger horses, such as varieties of Cleveland Bay, could be used on higher underground roadways, but on many duties small ponies no more than 12 hands (48 inches, 122 cm) high were needed. Shetlands were a breed commonly used because of their small size, but Welsh, Russian, Devonshire (Dartmoor) and Cornish ponies also saw extensive use in England. In the interwar period, ponies were imported into Britain from the Faroe Islands, Iceland and the United States. Geldings and stallions only were used. Donkeys were also used in the late 19th century, and in the United States, large numbers of mules were used. Regardless of breed, typical mining ponies were low set, heavy bodied and heavy limbed with plenty of bone and substance, low-headed and sure-footed. Under the British Coal Mines Act 1911 (1 & 2 Geo. 5. c. 50), ponies had to be four years old and work ready (shod and vet checked) before going underground. They could work until their twenties.

== Work ==
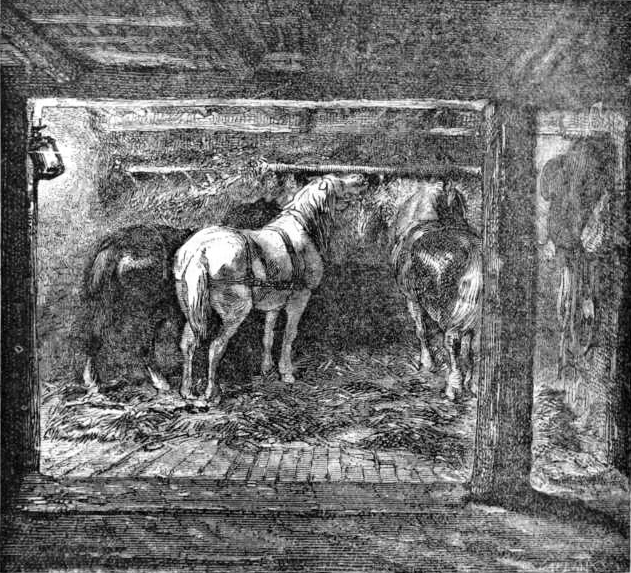
Nineteenth-century illustration of a stable in a mine

In shaft mines, ponies were normally stabled underground and fed on a diet with a high proportion of chopped hay and maize, coming to the surface only during the colliery's annual holiday. In slope and drift mines, the stables were usually on the surface near the mine entrance.

Typically, they would work an eight-hour shift each day, during which they might haul 30 tons of coal in tubs on the underground mine railway. One 1911 writer estimated that the average working life of coal mining mules was only 3 1/2 years, where 20-year working lives were common on the surface. Recollections differ on how well the ponies were cared for in earlier years.

== In art ==
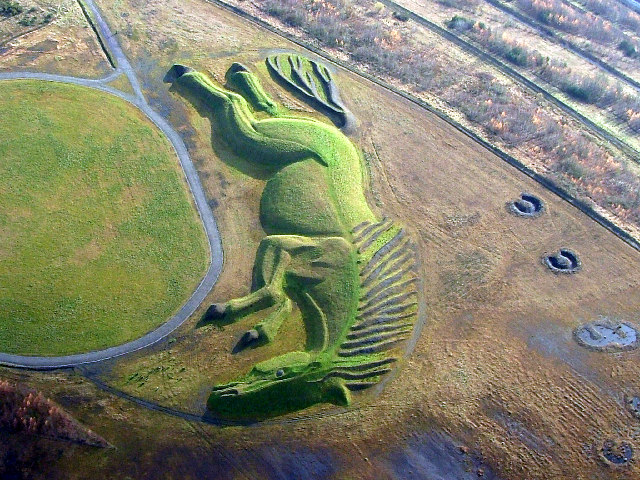
Sultan, on the site of Penallta Colliery

Pit ponies are commemorated by a 200 metres (660 ft) artwork, Sultan, created between 1996 and 1999 by Mike Petts, using 60,000 tons of coal shale waste, covered with living grass, in a country park on the site of the former Penallta Colliery, north of Caerphilly, Wales. The artwork was named by local people, after one of the last pit ponies from the area, which was still living at the time.

== See also ==
- Escape from the Dark
- The Stars Look Down
- Cruelty to animals
- Animal rights
