= Coal Mines Act 1911 =

Act of the Parliament of the United Kingdom

Coal Mines Act 1911 (Note: Section 127(1).)
- Act of Parliament
- Parliament of the United Kingdom
- Long title: An Act to consolidate and amend the Law relating to Coal Mines and certain other mines.
- Citation: 1 & 2 Geo. 5. c. 50
- Territorial extent: United Kingdom

Dates
- Royal assent: 16 December 1911
- Commencement: 1 July 1912 (Note: Section 127(2).)
- Repealed: England and Wales and Scotland: 1 January 1957 (Note: The Mines and Quarries Act 1954 (Commencement) Order 1956 (SI 1956/1530).); Northern Ireland:
Other legislation
Amends	See § Repealed enactments
Repeals/revokes	See § Repealed enactments
Amended by	Statute Law Revision Act 1950; Workmen's Compensation Act 1943; Coal Industry Act 1949
Repealed by	England and Wales and Scotland: Mines and Quarries Act 1954; Northern Ireland: Mines Act (Northern Ireland) 1969

Status: Repealed

Text of statute as originally enacted

The Coal Mines Act 1911 (1 & 2 Geo. 5. c. 50) was an act of the Parliament of the United Kingdom that consolidated and amended enactments related to the regulation of coal mines and certain other mines in the United Kingdom.

A series of mine disasters in the 19th and early-20th centuries had led to commissions of enquiry and legislation to improve mining safety. The Coal Mines Act 1911, sponsored by Winston Churchill, was passed by the Liberal government of H. H. Asquith. It built on earlier regulations and provided for many improvement to safety and other aspects of the coal mining industry. An important aspect was that mine owners were required to ensure there were mines rescue stations near each colliery with equipped and trained staff.

Although amended several times, it was the main legislation governing coal mining for many years.

== Background ==
In the United Kingdom a series of disasters in the 19th century brought about royal commissions which developed the idea of improving mine safety.

In 1906 a major explosion at a colliery in Courrières, northern France, caused the deaths of more than 1,000 miners. The subsequent report blamed the accidental ignition of firedamp, exacerbated by coal dust in the air. Concerned that a similar disaster might happen in British collieries, a royal commission was formed, reporting back in 1907, 1909 and 1911.

On 9 April 1908 an explosion at Norton Hill Collieries at Westfield approximately 1,500 feet (460 m) underground killed 10 men and boys. As there were no mine rescue teams at that time, the manager and volunteers searched for survivors for 10 days.

The civil servant Malcolm Delevingne had a significant influence on safety regulations in factories and mines. He did a considerable amount of work on the act.

Richard Redmayne joined the Home Office as the first Chief Inspector of Mines in 1908 and worked with Delevingne to bring about the act. The royal commission reports led to the Coal Mines Act 1911, which came force into December that year.

== Passage ==
Winston Churchill was instrumental in the passing of the Coal Mines Act 1911. Implemented by the Liberal government of H. H. Asquith, it was the culmination of legislation enacted in the 19th century.

== Provisions ==
The act amended and consolidated the law related to coal mines, including the Coal Mines Regulation Act 1887 (50 & 51 Vict. c. 58) and subsequent regulations. It embodied legislation in the United Kingdom regarding the management of mines, safety provisions, health, accidents, regulations, employment, inspectors and other subjects. The act and other reforms by the Liberal government had the effect of weakening the Labour Party's independence.

The Labour Party had to support the Liberal reforms, and was therefore criticised by revolutionary socialists and syndicalists.

The act was the main statute regulating mining health and safety in the period between World War I (1914–18) and World War II (1939–45).

Under the act the government could introduce new safety regulations without seeking legislative approval.

The 1911 act was followed by a series of acts to further improve working practices including the Coal Mines (Minimum Wage Act) 1912, Coal Mines Act General Regulations 1913, Coal Mines Act 1914 and Coal Mines Act 1919. The acts made working conditions safer and less arduous, and also improved productivity.

=== Safety provisions ===
A royal commission of 1886 had recommended that rescue stations be created, but they had not been made compulsory.

The act required all mine owners to establish rescue stations, provide teams of trained rescuers, and to keep and maintain rescue apparatus.

In 1912 the government revised the regulations concerning ambulances and rescue apparatus, and the training of their operators. There had to be a rescue station within 10 miles (16 km) of any mine with more than 100 employees. That limit was raised to 15 miles (24 km) a few years later. The result was a rapid increase in the number of rescue stations between 1911 and 1918. By 1918 there were ten Scheme "A" stations with permanent full-time rescue teams, and 36 Scheme "B" stations with officers and instructors who trained miners in rescue.

Henry Fleuss developed a form of self-contained breathing apparatus that was used after an explosion at Seaham Colliery in 1881. The apparatus was further developed by Siebe Gorman into the Proto rebreather. In 1908 the Proto apparatus was chosen in a trial of equipment from several manufacturers to select the most efficient apparatus for use underground at Howe Bridge Mines Rescue Station. It became the standard in rescue stations set up after the Coal Mines Act 1911.

The act required mine operators to guard against coal dust explosions, but did not dictate the approach to be taken.

After an explosion at Senghenydd in South Wales in 1913 Home Secretary Reginald McKenna and the employers yielded to a demand by the Miners' Federation of Great Britain (MFGB) for a special court of inquiry with representation from miners and employers. The inquiry did not establish the cause of the explosion but did find that the company had failed to comply with the act's requirement to install reversible fans and to measure underground air currents. The act stated that fans should operate continuously while colliers were working on the face.

Failure to observe this rule was one of the causes of an explosion at Wharncliffe Silkstone in May 1914 that caused twelve deaths.

=== Other provisions ===
The act granted miners an eight-hour day. (Note: The Coal Mines Regulation Act 1908 (8 Edw. 7. c. 57) (Eight Hours Day Act) had limited working hours to eight hours, but since it excluding winding times the average bank-to-bank hours in the UK were eight hours and thirty nine minutes. (Note: The "bank" is the area at the top of the mine shaft. "Winding" is the process of lowering or raising the cage in the shaft. Miners had to wait their turn before descending or coming back up, and the waiting period and the period in the cage did not count in the working day calculation.) The Monmouthshire and South Wales Coal Owners' Association had published figures for South Wales collieries that showed that bank-to-bank hours had been reduced from nine and a half to eight and a half hours. The Coal Mines Regulation Act 1908 had allowed for an additional 60 hours to be worked annually over and above the eight hours daily, and the owners insisted on the hours being worked.)

No boy aged under 14 could be employed below ground unless they had been working below ground before the act was passed. Boys under 16 could not be employed above ground at night, although they could be employed underground.

The act brought in strict regulations to provide for the general welfare of pit ponies working in the mines, although the use of ponies would continue for many years.

The act provided that a manager or under-manager had to personally supervise each mine on a daily basis. It established the Mining Qualifications Board to ensure that colliery managers and under-managers, firemen, deputies and shot-firers who would be wholly or partly responsible for mining safety were suitably qualified, and to issue certificates of competence.

Mine owners were required to secure disused or abandoned mine openings against accidental entry.

Section 97(1) of the act specified that Welsh-speakers in Wales would be preferred as inspectors of mines in Wales, but the Mines Department did not take this rule seriously.

Provided always that, in the appointment of inspectors of mines in Wales and Monmouthshire, among candidates otherwise equally qualified, persons having a knowledge of the Welsh language shall be preferred.

=== Repealed enactments ===
Section 126 of the act repealed 7 enactments, listed in the fourth schedule to the act.

Citation	Short title	Extent of repeal
50 & 51 Vict. c. 58	Coal Mines Regulation Act 1887	The whole act, except sections one, three, twelve, thirteen, fourteen, and fifteen.
59 & 60 Vict. c. 43	Coal Mines Regulation Act 1896	The whole act.
63 & 64 Vict. c. 21	Mines (Prohibition of Child Labour Underground) Act 1900	The whole act so far as it relates to mines to which this Act applies.
3 Edw. 7. c. 7	Coal Mines Regulation Act (1887) Amendment Act 1903	The whole act.
6 Edw. 7. c. 53	Notice of Accidents Act 1906	Sections one, two, three, and five so far as they relate to mines to which this Act applies.
7 Edw. 7. c. 10	Employment of Women Act 1907	Section one, so far as it relates to the Coal Mines Regulation Act 1887.
10 Edw. 7. & 1 Geo. 5. c. 15	Mines Accidents (Rescue and Aid) Act 1910	The whole act so far as it relates to mines to which this Act applies.

== Subsequent developments ==
The second paragraph of section 62 of the act from " but any tub " to the end of the paragraph was repealed by section 1(1) of, and the first schedule to, the Statute Law Revision Act 1950 (14 Geo. 6. c. 6), which came into force on 23 May 1950.

The whole act was repealed for England and Wales and Scotland by section 189 of, and the fifth schedule to, the Mines and Quarries Act 1954 (2 & 3 Eliz. 2. c. 70), which came into force on 1 January 1957.

== Bibliography ==
- Bartrip, P. W. J. (2004). "Delevingne, Sir Malcolm (1868–1950), civil servant". Oxford Dictionary of National Biography (online ed.). Oxford University Press. doi:10.1093/ref:odnb/3277. (Subscription, Wikipedia Library access or UK public library membership required.)
- Baylies, Carolyn (2 September 2003), History of the Yorkshire Miners 1881–1918, Routledge, ISBN 978-1-134-87070-7
- Beer, Max (18 October 2001), A History of British Socialism, Psychology Press, ISBN 978-0-415-26569-0
- British Parliament (1911), Coal Mines Act, 1911, Durham Mining Museum
- Brown, John H (2009). The Valley of the Shadow: An account of Britain's worst mining disaster, the Senghennydd explosion. Port Talbot, West Glamorgan: Alun Books. ISBN 978-0-907117-06-3.
- Bunt, J. (August 1975), "The Coal Mines Act of 1911", Colliery Guardian Annual Review
- Church, Roy; Outram, Quentin (9 May 2002), Strikes and Solidarity: Coalfield Conflict in Britain, 1889-1966, Cambridge University Press, ISBN 978-0-521-89403-6
- Davies, Alan (2009), Atherton Collieries, Amberley, ISBN 978-1-84868-489-8
- Ewer, T. K. (1 January 1982), Practical Animal Husbandry, Elsevier Science, ISBN 978-1-4831-8398-5
- Ginsberg, Morris (1959), Law and Opinion in England in the 20th Century, University of California Press
- Holmes, David (9 December 2013), Statutory Nuisance Mineshafts - Methods of Investigation and Duties of Local Authorities, Lulu.com, ISBN 978-1-291-63724-3
- Houghton Mines Rescue 100 Years and Still Serving the Community 1913–2013, Mines Rescue Service Limited, Houghton le Spring, 2013
- "Impact of Liberal reforms", BBC, archived from the original on 22 December 2016
- Johns, Michael (26 August 2008), "The disaster that changed mining", This is Bristol
- Mines Rescue (PDF), National Coal Mining Museum for England
- Mitchell, B. R. (23 August 1984), Economic Development of the British Coal Industry 1800-1914, CUP Archive, ISBN 978-0-521-26501-0
- "Obituary: Sir M. Delevingne". The Times. 1 December 1950. p. 8.
- Preece, Geoff; Ellis, Peter (1981), Coalmining, a handbook to the History of Coalmining Gallery, Salford Museum of Mining, City of Salford Cultural Services
- "Richard Redmayne", Oxford Dictionary of National Biography entry
- Singleton, John (25 March 2016), Economic and Natural Disasters since 1900: A Comparative History, Edward Elgar Publishing, ISBN 978-1-78254-735-8
- US Department of Labor (1913), Prohibition of Night Work of Young Persons, U.S. Government Printing Office
- Wain, Ken (30 June 2014), The Coal Mining Industry of Sheffield and North Derbyshire, Amberley Publishing Limited, ISBN 978-1-4456-3975-8
- Williamson, Stanley (1999), Gresford: The Anatomy of a Disaster, Liverpool University Press, ISBN 978-0-85323-902-4
