= The Cry of the Children =

1912 American silent film directed by George Nichols

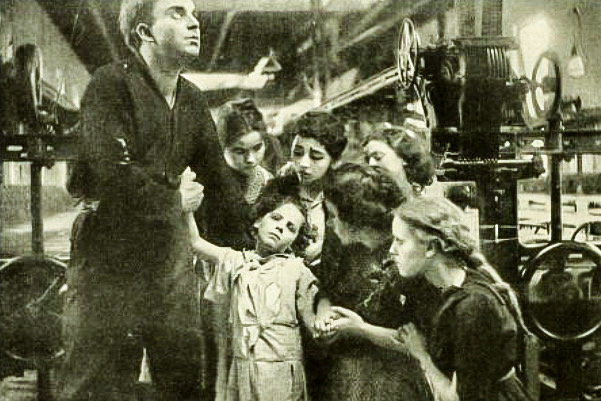
- Alice (Marie Eline, center) with other child laborers and her father (James Cruze, left)
- Directed by: George Nichols
- Based on: "The Cry of the Children" by Elizabeth Barrett Browning
- Cinematography: Carl Louis Gregory
- Production company: Thanhouser Company
- Release date: April 30, 1912
- Running time: 2 reels (2000 feet, original print 29 minutes)
- Country: United States

The Cry of the Children is a 1912 American silent short drama film directed by George Nichols for the Thanhouser Company. The production, based on the poem by Elizabeth Barrett Browning about child labor, stars Marie Eline, Ethel Wright, and James Cruze. At the time of its release, the film proved to be controversial for its use of real-life footage of children working inside a large textile factory. In 2011, the film was selected for preservation in the National Film Registry by the Library of Congress for being "culturally, historically, or aesthetically significant".

The film incorporates original lines from the Browning's poem in the film's intertitles, presented within quotation marks without a discernible speaker.

== Cast ==
- Marie Eline as Alice, the little girl
- Ethel Wright as The working mother
- James Cruze as The working father
- Lila Chester as The factory owner's wife
- William Russell as The factory owner

PLAY film (26-minute copy)
