= Mines Regulation Act 1860 =

Act of the Parliament of the United Kingdom

- Act of Parliament
- Parliament of the United Kingdom
- Long title: An Act for the Regulation and Inspection of Mines.
- Citation: 23 & 24 Vict. c. 151
- Territorial extent: England and Wales; Scotland; (Note: Section 30.)

Dates
- Royal assent: 28 August 1860
- Commencement: 31 December 1860 (Note: Section 31.)
- Repealed: 1 January 1873
Other legislation
Amends	Mines and Collieries Act 1842
Repeals/revokes	Coal Mines Act 1855
Repealed by	Metalliferous Mines Regulation Act 1872; Coal Mines Regulation Act 1872

Status: Repealed

Text of statute as originally enacted

The Mines Regulation Act 1860 (23 & 24 Vict. c. 151), also known as the Mines Act 1860, the Inspection of Mines Act 1860, the Regulation and Inspection of Mines Act 1860, the Coal Mines Act 1860, the Coal Mines Regulation Act 1860, the Inspection and Regulation of Coal Mines Act 1860, or the Inspection of Coal Mines Act 1860, was an act of the Parliament of the United Kingdom that raised the age of children working in coal mines from 10 to 12 years of age. There were exceptions if the boys could read and write or attended school for six hours per week. The Act also improved safety rules.

== Background ==
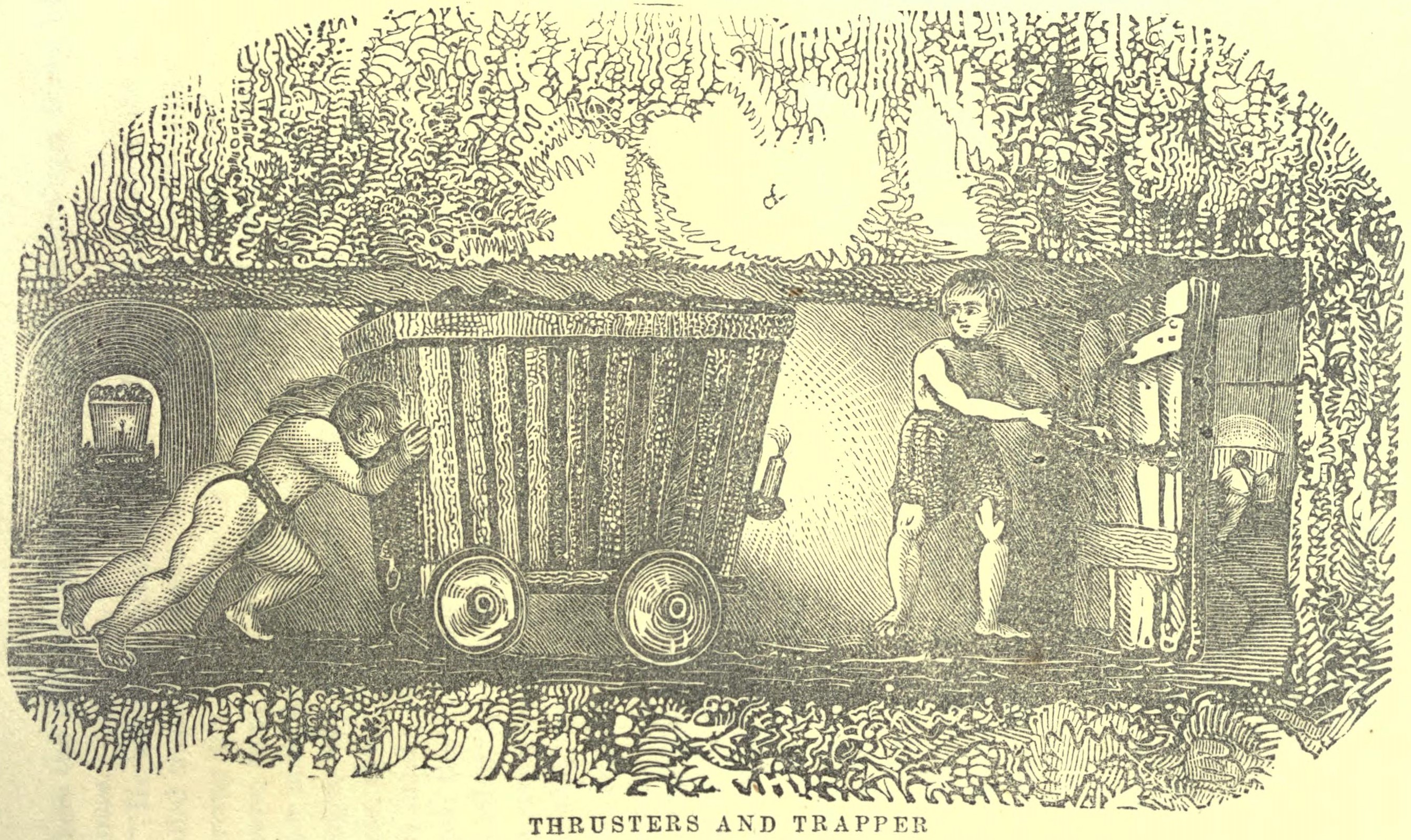
Two thrusters and a trapper (who worked the ventilation doors, usually boys) in a UK coal mine about 1853.

During the Victorian era, there was concern about working conditions for women and children in mills, factories, workshops, and particularly in coal mines. A report by a royal commission, conducted in 1842 showed that there were children eight years of age and younger who were employed in the mines. In eastern Scotland, there were both girls and boys who worked in the mines. There were also women who worked in mines. The key finding was that mine owners were not concerned about the working conditions, which were found to be degrading.

In 1842, the Mines and Collieries Bill was passed in Parliament to prevent girls and women from working underground and placed a minimum age of ten for boys. Anthony Ashley-Cooper supported the bill. Due to the number of accidents in coal mines, the Coal Mines Inspection Act 1850 (13 & 14 Vict. c. 100) mandated the appointment of coal mine inspectors who reported to the Home Office. The 1850 act stipulated the inspector's responsibilities and powers. The legislation focused on improving ventilation, lighting, and workers' safety.

== Legislation ==
One hundred and fourteen men and boys were killed on 15 July 1856 as the result of the Cymmer Colliery explosion at the Old Pit mine of the Cymmer Colliery near Porth, Wales. The underground explosion of gas resulted in a "sacrifice of human life to an extent unparalleled in the history of coal mining of this country".

The act raised the minimum age for male coal mine workers to 12 years of age, from ten. It did allow a provision for boys between ten and twelve years of age to work at the mines under two conditions. One was that they could read and write, as documented by a schoolmaster. Another condition allowed them to work in the mines if they attended school for six hours per week (three hours twice a week).

It also improved safety rules. Miners were given the ability to select checkweighman, but mine owners were also given the ability to dismiss them.

== Impact to further legislation ==
Checkweighman's positions were made secure with the Metalliferous Mines Regulation Act 1872 (35 & 36 Vict. c. 77). From 1873, boys below the age of twelve were excluded from underground employment. Exemptions could be ordered by the Secretary of State for mines working thin seams.

== Above ground work ==
There were regulations for above ground work for boys and girls. The minimum age for part-time work was 10 years of age, and 12 years of age for full-time work.

== Subsequent developments ==
The whole act, so far as not repealed by the Coal Mines Regulation Act 1872 (35 & 36 Vict. c. 76) was repealed by section 45 of, and the schedule to, the Metalliferous Mines Regulation Act 1872 (35 & 36 Vict. c. 77), which came into force on 1 January 1873.

The whole act, so far as "it relates to mines to which this act applies", was repealed by section 76 of, and schedule 3 to, the Coal Mines Regulation Act 1872 (35 & 36 Vict. c. 76), which came into force on 1 January 1873.
