= Coal Mines Regulation Act 1872 =

Act of the Parliament of the United Kingdom

Coal Mines Regulation Act 1872 (Note: Section 1.)
- Act of Parliament
- Parliament of the United Kingdom
- Long title: An Act to consolidate and amend the Acts relating to the Regulation of Coal Mines and certain other Mines.
- Citation: 35 & 36 Vict. c. 76
- Territorial extent: United Kingdom

Dates
- Royal assent: 10 August 1872
- Commencement: England and Wales and Scotland: 1 January 1873; Ireland: 1 January 1874 (Note: Section 2.)
- Repealed: 1 January 1888
Other legislation
Amends	See § Repealed enactments
Repeals/revokes	See § Repealed enactments
Amended by	Coal Mines Act 1886
Repealed by	Coal Mines Regulation Act 1887
Relates to	Metalliferous Mines Regulation Act 1872

Status: Repealed

Text of statute as originally enacted

The Coal Mines Regulation Act 1872 (35 & 36 Vict. c. 76) was an act of the Parliament of the United Kingdom that consolidated enactments related to the regulation of coal mines and certain other mines in the United Kingdom.

The Metalliferous Mines Regulation Act 1872 (35 & 36 Vict. c. 77), which consolidated enactments related to the regulation of metalliferous mines, was passed alongside the act.

== Provisions ==
=== Repealed enactments ===
Section 76 of the act repealed 3 enactments, listed in schedule three to the act.

Citation	Short title	Description	Extent of repeal
5 & 6 Vict. c. 99	Mines and Collieries Act 1842	An Act to prohibit the employment of women and girls in mines and collieries, to regulate the employment of boys, and to make other provisions relating to persons working therein.	The whole act so far as it relates to mines to which this Act applies.
23 & 24 Vict. c. 151	Mines Act 1860	An Act for the regulation and inspection of mines.	Sections one to five, both inclusive, so far as they relate to mines to which this Act applies, and the residue of the Act entirely.
25 & 26 Vict. c. 79	Coal Mines Act 1862	An Act to amend the law relating to coal mines.	The whole act.

== Subsequent developments ==
The whole act was repealed by section 84 of, and the fourth schedule to, the Coal Mines Regulation Act 1887 (50 & 51 Vict. c. 58), which came into operation on 1 January 1888.
