= Metalliferous Mines Regulation Act 1872 =

Act of the Parliament of the United Kingdom

Metalliferous Mines Regulation Act 1872 (Note: Section 1.)
- Act of Parliament
- Parliament of the United Kingdom
- Long title: An Act to consolidate and amend the Law relating to Metalliferous Mines.
- Citation: 35 & 36 Vict. c. 77
- Territorial extent: United Kingdom

Dates
- Royal assent: 10 August 1872
- Commencement: 1 January 1873 (Note: Section 2.)
- Repealed: England and Wales and Scotland: 1 January 1957; Isle of Man: 20 February 1958; Northern Ireland:
Other legislation
Amends	See § Repealed enactments
Repeals/revokes	See § Repealed enactments
Amended by	Metalliferous Mines Regulation Act 1875; Metalliferous Mines (Isle of Man) Act 1891; Mines (Prohibition of Child Labour Underground) Act 1900
Repealed by	England and Wales and Scotland: Mines and Quarries Act 1954; Isle of Man: Isle of Man Act 1958; Northern Ireland: Mines Act (Northern Ireland) 1969
Relates to	Coal Mines Regulation Act 1872

Status: Repealed

Text of statute as originally enacted

The Metalliferous Mines Regulation Act 1872 (35 & 36 Vict. c. 77) was an act of the Parliament of the United Kingdom that consolidated enactments related to the regulation of metalliferous mines in the United Kingdom.

The Coal Mines Regulation Act 1872 (35 & 36 Vict. c. 76), which consolidated enactments related to the regulation of coal mines, was passed alongside the act.

== Provisions ==
=== Repealed enactments ===
Section 45 of the act repealed 2 enactments, listed in the schedule to the act.

Citation	Short title	Description	Extent of repeal
5 & 6 Vict. c. 99	Mines and Collieries Act 1842	An Act to prohibit the employment of women and girls in mines and collieries, to regulate the employment of boys, and to make other provisions relating to persons working therein.	So far as not repealed by the Coal Mines Regulation Act 1872.
23 & 24 Vict. c. 151	Mines Act 1860	An Act for the regulation and inspection of mines.	So far as not repealed by the Coal Mines Regulation Act 1872.

== Subsequent developments ==
The whole act was repealed for England and Wales and Scotland by section 189 of, and the fifth schedule to, the Mines and Quarries Act 1954 (2 & 3 Eliz. 2. c. 70), which came into operation on 1 January 1957.

The whole act was repealed for the Isle of Man by section 1(1) of, and part I of the schedule to, the Isle of Man Act 1958 (6 & 7 Eliz. 2. c. 11), which came into force on 20 February 1958.
