= A Leap for Love =

1912 film

A Leap for Love is a 1912 American short romantic drama film released on 13 April 1912 by Independent Motion Picture Company.

== Cast ==
- Ethel Wright as Marguerite Leonard
- Frank Hall Crane as Samuel Kingston
- Rodman Law as Alfred Lane
- Hayward Mack as Ralph Judson
