= Penallta Colliery =

Coal mine in Wales

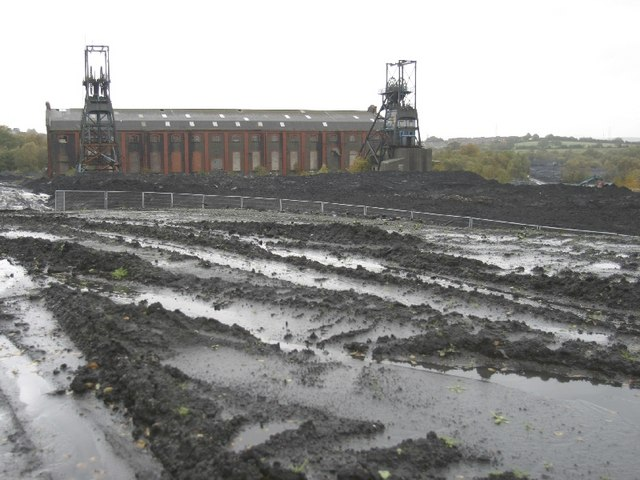

- Location within Caerphilly
- Location: Hengoed, Caerphilly, , Wales; 51.6544°N 3.2447°W
- Products: Steam coal
- Opened: 1905
- Active: 1909–1991
- Closed: 1991
- Company: Powell Duffryn; National Coal Board

Penallta Colliery was a coal mine, located close to Hengoed in the Rhymney Valley in the South Wales Valleys. A coal mine which in 1935 held the European record for coal wound in a 24-hour period, it is now the site of an original redevelopment project which will make use of the former pit head buildings.

== History ==
Situated near Hengoed, in 1905 Powell Duffryn began the sinking of Penallta colliery, and had employed 291 men by 1908. The two shafts Nos.1 (downcast 783 yards (716 m)) and 2 (upcast 750 yards (690 m)), and at the time were the deepest in the South Wales Coalfield. The first coal was raised in 1909, with the railway served by the Cylla branch which connected it to both the Rhymney Railway from the Ystrad Mynach north junction, and the Newport, Abergavenny and Hereford Railway. By 1923 there were 2,395 men employed, producing from the Six Feet seam, and at peak production during the 1930s, there were in excess of 3,200 men employed. In 1930 it produced 975,603 tons, and in 1935 it held the European record for coal winding.

=== Nationalisation ===
In 1947, the mine was nationalised as part of the governments post-World War II regeneration scheme, and became owned by the National Coal Board. Investment was made, and in the late 1940s a Meco-Moore Cutter Loader was installed, one of the first power loaders to be used in British mines, and as a result the Minister of Fuel and Power Hugh Gaitskell made a visit in December 1949. The colliery formed a rugby union club in 1952 called Penallta RFC, and in 1954 produced 500,000 tonnes of coal. During 1960 the shafts were extended to reach 800 yards as part of a scheme, which also included electrification of the shaft winding engines.

But access to coal was becoming more difficult, and by the 1970s only 700 men were producing 210,000 tons yearly from the Lower Nine Feet and Seven Feet seams – both 20% of the figures at the height of production. The colliery survived the 1984–1985 miners' strike, and made impressive gains in production after the return to work. It was closed by British Coal on 1 November 1991 with the last shift led out by a brass band. It was the last deep mine working in the Rhymney Valley.

=== Penallta Country Park ===
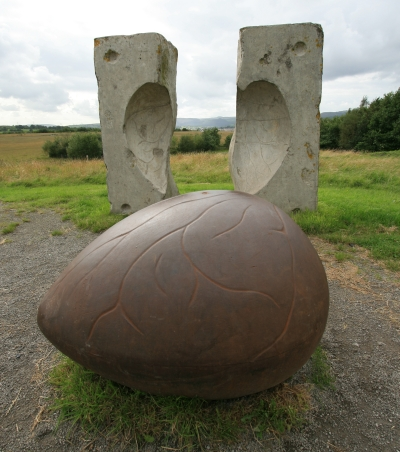
Breaking the Mould at Parc Penallta by Andrew McKeown

In 1996, a vision for Penallta was put forward by Caerphilly County Borough Council, in partnership with Groundwork Wales and various local community, statutory and voluntary agencies. Stage 1 of the project converted 180 hectares of derelict land into Penallta Country Park. Stage 2 created more access, through the installation of a bridle path and cycle tracks, and a stone footpath.

To complete redevelopment of Penallta, the council developed a business park on the site, and have now agreed a development project which will result in a housing estate on part of the site, whereby the listed building status of the headgear of the two shafts are proposed to be part of a pioneering housing development scheme.

Several of the colliery buildings and structures are Grade II* listed, including the colliery baths, engine hall and the pit's headframe. The Twentieth Century Society added the pithead baths and site canteen to its Risk List of architecture at risk of being lost in 2025.

=== Sultan ===
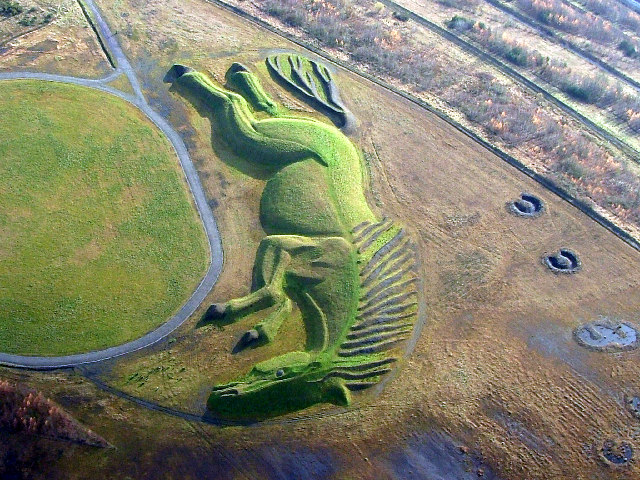
The pit pony sculpture, constructed from the spoil tip.

A 200 metres (660 ft) artwork, Sultan, created between 1996 and 1999 by Mike Petts, commemorates pit ponies. It uses 60,000 tons of coal shale waste, covered with living grass. The artwork was named by local people, after one of the last pit ponies from the area, which was still living at the time.
