= Fighting Death =

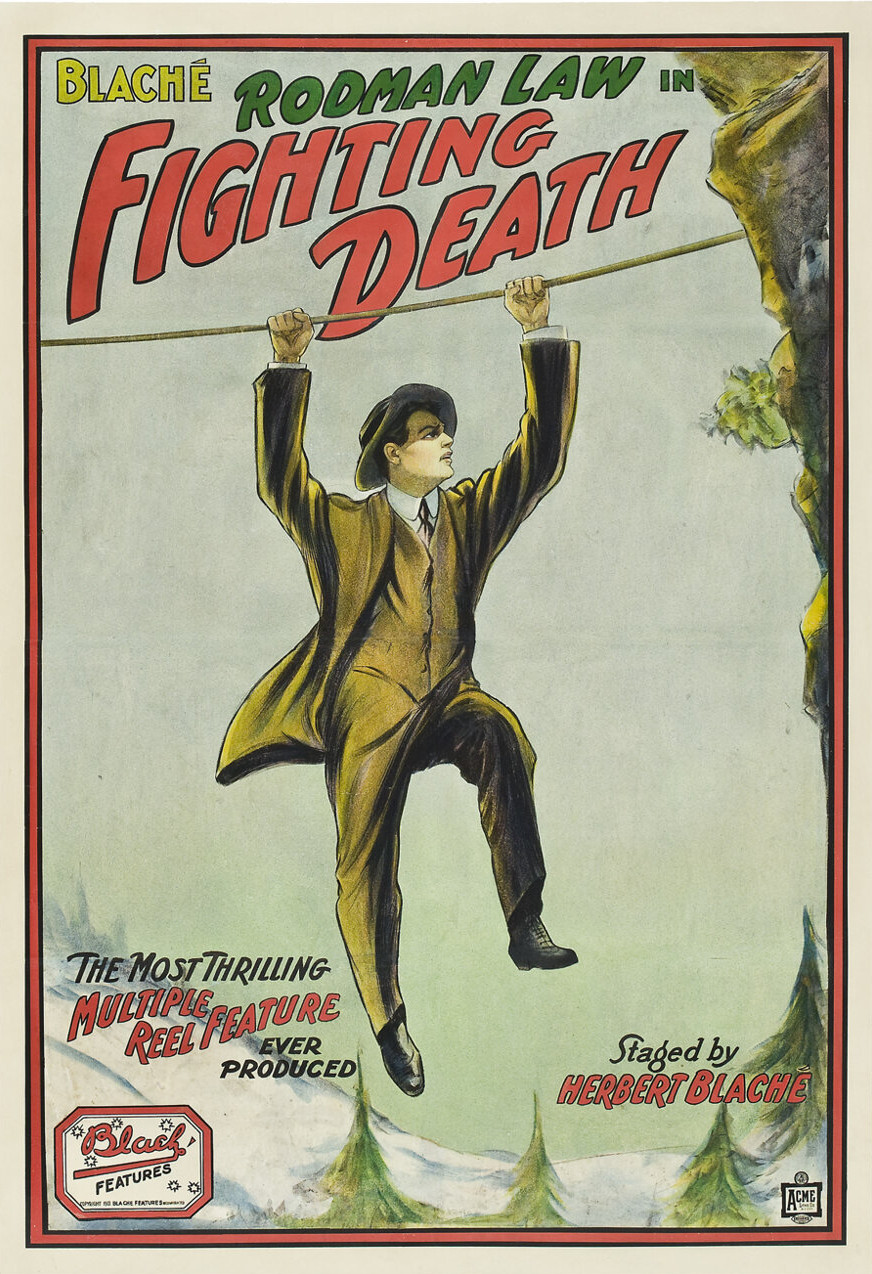
- Film Poster
- Directed by: Herbert Blaché
- Starring: Claire Whitney; Rodman Law
- Production companies: Solax Studios; Blache Features
- Distributed by: Box Office Attractions
- Release date: April 10, 1914
- Running time: 4 reels
- Country: USA
- Language: Silent..English intertitles

Fighting Death is a lost 1914 silent adventure drama film directed by Herbert Blaché and starring early stunt performer Rodman Law and Claire Whitney. It was produced by the historic Solax Film Company.

Some filming involving stuntman Law took place at the Williamsburg Bridge.

== Cast ==
- Claire Whitney as Clara
- Rodman Law as Jim Mason
- Constance Bennett as Stunt Double for Clara (*note not Constance Bennett)

== Preservation ==
With no holdings located in archives, Fighting Death is considered a lost film.
