= Rodman Law =

American aviator

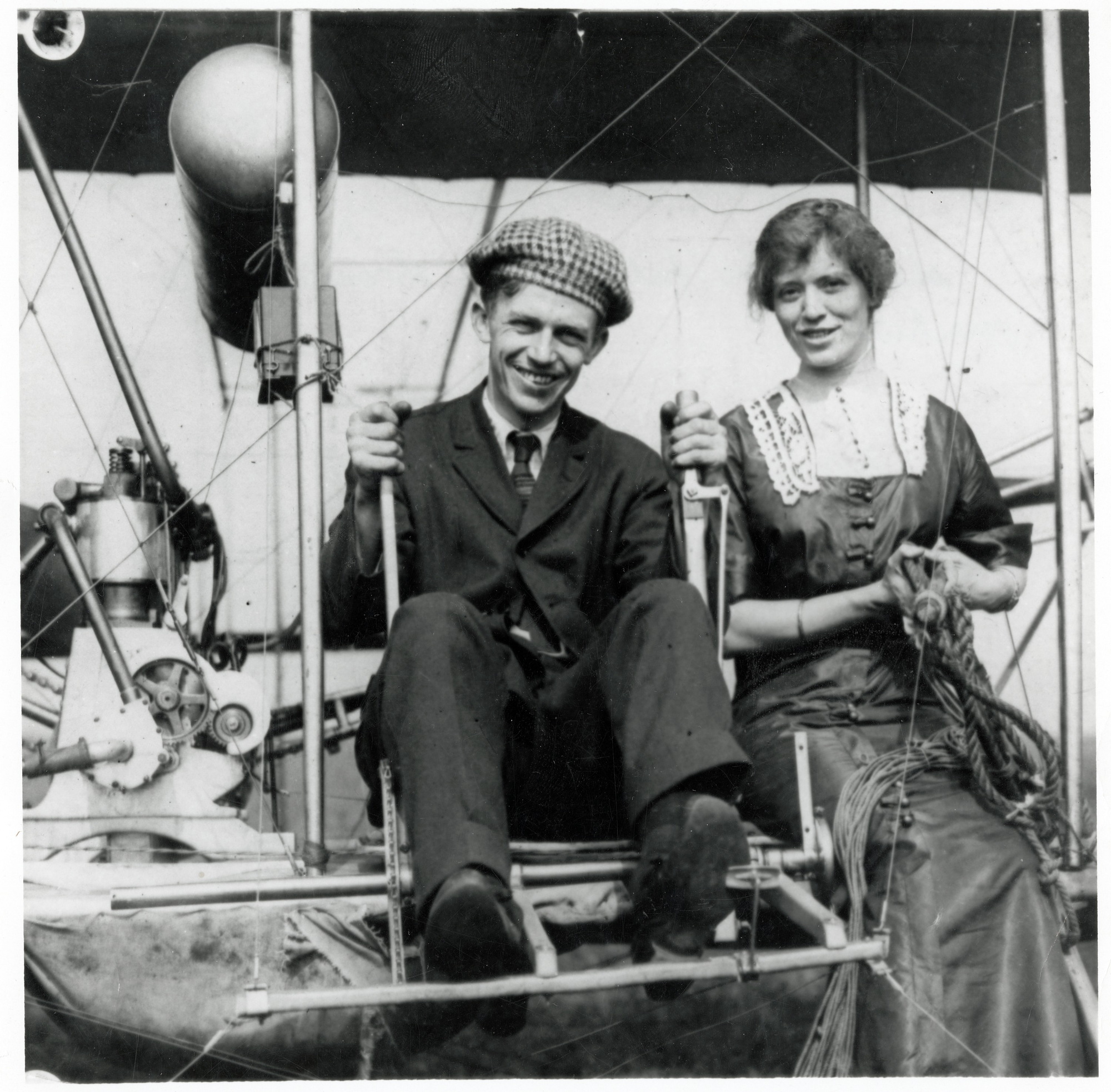
- Frederick Rodman Law and Ruth B. Law in her Wright Model B flyer circa 1912-1915
- Born: Frederick Rodman Law; 21 January 1885; Lynn, Massachusetts
- Died: 14 October 1919 (aged 34); Greenville, South Carolina
- Other name: "The Human Fly"
- Occupations: Parachutist, stuntman, actor
- Relatives: Ruth Law (sister)

Rodman Law (born Frederick Rodman Law; January 21, 1885 – October 14, 1919) was an American parachutist, building climber and later silent movie stuntman and actor.

== Biography ==
He was the older brother of pioneering aviator Ruth Law Oliver. Law married Florence Kimball and was the father of three children. The family made their home in Brooklyn. Law lived in Chicago and Texas.

On February 2, 1912 Law parachuted or BASE jumped off the top of the candle of the Statue of Liberty. Law starred in or participated in several silent movies including a 1914 film built around his exploits Daredevil Rodman Law. His female co-stars in his movies were Claire Whitney, Jean Acker, Ethel Wright, Rosanna Forbes, Beryl Bouton and Constance Bennett, unrelated to the 1930s film actress of the same name.

Law was seriously injured while performing a stunt in 1914; by 1917, the injury was troubling enough that he entered Kings Hospital in Brooklyn for treatment. During the long hospitalization, the money Law had made through his work in films went to pay hospital bills and to support his family. Law had almost given up stunt work, but when the US entered World War I, Law enlisted in the Army Aviation Corps. He was assigned to Kelly Field in Texas, where he returned to performing parachute jumping.

Law contracted tuberculosis while at Kelly Field. He died of the disease at Camp Sevier in Greenville, South Carolina on October 14, 1919, after being hospitalized there for a few months. Law was believed to be improving; at the time of his death he was planning to perform another parachute jumping stunt.

== Filmography ==
- A Leap for Love (1912)
- The Secret Service Man (1912)
- At the Risk of His Life (1912)
- Saved by Airship (1913)
- Death's Short Cut (1913)
- His Priceless Treasure (1913)
- The Daredevil Mountaineer (1913)
- Fighting Death (1914)

== See also ==
- Stunt performer
