= Ethel Wright (actor) =

American actress

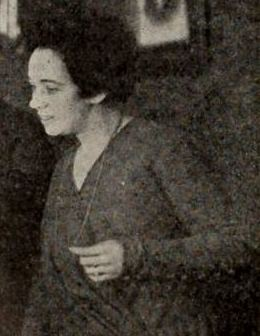
- Bolshevism on Trial in 1919.
- Born: June 24, 1884; Mineral Point, Wisconsin, U.S.
- Died: November 7, 1958 (aged 74); New Jersey, U.S.
- Years active: 1912-1924
- Spouse: Hugh Nesbitt (m. 1915–1958)
- Parents: Samuel Wright; Catherine J. Wright

Ethel Wright Nesbitt (June 24, 1884 – November 7, 1958) was an American actress and teacher.

Wright was born in Mineral Point, Wisconsin, the second of three daughters born to lawyer Samuel Wright and his wife Catherine J Wright. All four of her grandparents were born in England. She had an older sister, Edna Wright, who was an activist and suffragette, and a younger sister, Rowe Wright, who was a magazine and book editor.

Wright appeared in several silent films, including as Marguerite Leonard in A Leap for Love (1912), the working mother in The Cry of the Children (1912), the bank teller's wife in Vengeance Is Mine (1912), Catherine Wolff in Bolshevism on Trial (1919) and Mrs. Minnett in The Enchanted Cottage (1924).

In addition to acting, Wright was a high school teacher. She married mechanical engineer Hugh Nesbitt from New Jersey on June 12, 1915, in Milwaukee. From 1920 to 1945, she was principal of the Professional Children's School in New York City.

She died in New Jersey in 1958.

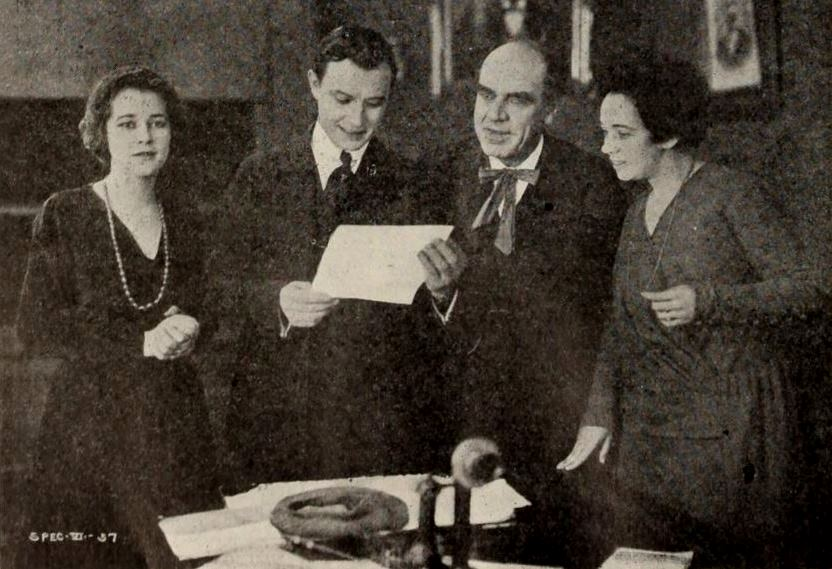
Ethel Wright at right in still from Bolshevism on Trial (1919)
