= Coal Mines Regulation Act 1908 =

Act of the Parliament of the United Kingdom

Coal Mines Regulation Act 1908 (Note: Section 8(3).)
- Act of Parliament
- Parliament of the United Kingdom
- Long title: An Act to amend the Coal Mines Regulation Acts 1887 to 1905, for the purpose of limiting hours of work below ground.
- Citation: 8 Edw. 7. c. 57
- Territorial extent: United Kingdom

Dates
- Royal assent: 21 December 1908
- Commencement: [1 January 1910 (in Northumberland & Durham only); 1 July 1909 (everywhere else); (Note: Section 8(2).)
- Repealed: England and Wales and Scotland: 20 November 1993 (Note: The Coal Industry Act 1992 (Commencement) Order 1993 (SI 1993/2514).); Northern Ireland: 1 October 1995 (Note: The Trade Union and Labour Relations (1995 Order) (Commencement and Transitional Provisions) Order (Northern Ireland) 1995 (SI 1995/354).)
Other legislation
Amended by	Coal Mines Regulation (Amendment) Act 1917; Coal Mines Act 1919; Coal Mines Act 1926; Statute Law Revision Act 1927; Coal Mines Act 1931; Mines and Quarries Act 1954; Sheriff Courts (Scotland) Act 1971; Criminal Procedure (Scotland) Act 1975; Sex Discrimination Act 1975; Criminal Justice Act 1982; Wages Act 1986
Repealed by	England and Wales and Scotland: Coal Industry Act 1992; Northern Ireland: Trade Union and Labour Relations (Northern Ireland) Order 1995
Relates to	Coal Mines Regulation Act 1887

Status: Repealed

Text of statute as originally enacted

Revised text of statute as amended

The Coal Mines Regulation Act 1908 (8 Edw. 7. c. 57), also known as the Eight Hours Act or the Coal Mines (Eight Hours) Act, was an act of the Parliament of the United Kingdom passed in 1908 by the Liberal government.

The act limited the hours a miner could work to eight hours per day.

== Subsequent developments ==
The whole act was repealed for England and Wales and Scotland by section 3(3) of, and part III of the schedule to, the Coal Industry Act 1992, which came into force on 20 November 1993.

The whole act was repealed by article 150(4) of, and schedule 4 to, the Trade Union and Labour Relations (Northern Ireland) Order 1995 (SI 1995/1980 (N.I. 12)), which came into force on 1 October 1995.

== See also ==
- Liberal reforms
