= Mines (Prohibition of Child Labour Underground) Act 1900 =

Act of the Parliament of the United Kingdom

Mines (Prohibition of Child Labour Underground) Act 1900 (Note: Section 3.)
- Act of Parliament
- Parliament of the United Kingdom
- Long title: An Act to prohibit Child Labour Underground in Mines.
- Citation: 63 & 64 Vict. c. 21
- Territorial extent: United Kingdom

Dates
- Royal assent: 30 July 1900
- Commencement: 30 July 1900 (Note: The Acts of Parliament (Commencement) Act 1793.)
- Repealed: 1 January 1957
Other legislation
Amends	Metalliferous Mines Regulation Act 1872; Coal Mines Regulation Act 1887
Amended by	Coal Mines Act 1911
Repealed by	Mines and Quarries Act 1954
Relates to	Employment of Women, Young Persons, and Children Act 1920

Status: Repealed

Text of statute as originally enacted

The Mines (Prohibition of Child Labour Underground) Act 1900 (63 & 64 Vict. c. 21) was an act of the Parliament of the United Kingdom. The statute prevented boys under the age of thirteen from working, or being (for the purposes of employment) in an underground mine.

An estimated 3,000 boys were affected by the new law, which was passed on 30 July 1900.

== Subsequent developments ==
The whole act so far as it related to collieries were repealed by section 126 of, and the fourth schedule to, the Coal Mines Act 1911 (1 & 2 Geo. 5. c. 50), which came into operation on 1 July 1912.

The whole act was repealed by section 189 of, and the fifth schedule to, the Mines and Quarries Act 1954 (2 & 3 Eliz. 2. c. 70), which came into force on 1 January 1957. By such time the act was out of date and was no longer necessary due to the stronger provisions in the Employment of Women, Young Persons, and Children Act 1920 (10 & 11 Geo. 5. c. 65).

== See also ==
- Mining in the United Kingdom
