= Mines and Quarries Act 1954 =

Act of the Parliament of the United Kingdom

Mines and Quarries Act 1954 (Note: Section 195(1).)
- Act of Parliament
- Parliament of the United Kingdom
- Long title: An Act to make fresh provision with respect to the management and control of mines and quarries and for securing the safety, health and welfare of persons employed thereat; to regulate the employment thereat of women and young persons; to require the fencing of abandoned and disused mines and of quarries; and for purposes connected with the matters aforesaid.
- Citation: 2 & 3 Eliz. 2. c. 70
- Territorial extent: England and Wales; Scotland; (Note: Section 195(2).)

Dates
- Royal assent: 25 November 1954
- Commencement: 25 November 1954 (sections 172 and 190) (Note: Section 194.); 1 January 1957 (rest of act) (Note: Section 194. The Mines and Quarries Act 1954 (Commencement) Order 1956 (SI 1956/1530).)
Other legislation
Amends	Coal Mines Regulation Act 1887; Coal Mines (Check Weigher) Act 1894; Coal Mines (Weighing of Minerals) Act 1905; Coal Mines Regulation Act 1908; Education Act 1918; Education (Scotland) Act 1918; Mining Industry Act 1920; Employment of Women, Young Persons, and Children Act 1920; Mining Industry Act 1926; Petroleum (Production) Act 1934; Hours of Employment (Conventions) Act 1936; Young Persons (Employment) Act 1938; See § Repealed enactments
Repeals/revokes	See § Repealed enactments
Amended by	Minister of Fuel and Power (Change of Style and Title) Order 1957; Transport Act 1962; London Government Act 1963; Mines and Quarries (Tips) Act 1969; Minister of Technology Order 1969; Secretary of State for Trade and Industry Order 1970; Criminal Justice Act 1972; Education Act 1973; Statute Law (Repeals) Act 1974; Mines and Quarries Acts 1954 to 1971 (Repeals and Modifications) Regulations 1974; Criminal Procedure (Scotland) Act 1975; Mines and Quarries Acts 1954 to 1971 (Repeals and Modifications) Regulations 1975; Mines and Quarries (Metrication) Regulations 1976; Interpretation Act 1978; Mines (Precautions Against Inrushes) Regulations 1979; Magistrates' Courts Act 1980; Notification of Accidents and Dangerous Occurrences Regulations 1980; Criminal Justice Act 1982; Coal and Other Mines (Safety-Lamps and Lighting) (Amendment) Regulations 1983; Roads (Scotland) Act 1984; Reporting of Injuries, Diseases and Dangerous Occurrences Regulations 1985; Wages Act 1986; Control of Substances Hazardous to Health Regulations 1988; Mines (Safety of Exit) Regulations 1988; Employment Act 1989; Electricity at Work Regulations 1989; Environmental Protection Act 1990; Coal Industry Act 1992; Manual Handling Operations Regulations 1992; Provision and Use of Work Equipment Regulations 1992; Mines (Shafts and Winding) Regulations 1993; Management and Administration of Safety and Health at Mines Regulations 1993; Environment Act 1995; Children (Scotland) Act 1995; Construction (Health, Safety and Welfare) Regulations 1996; Mines (Substances Hazardous to Health) Regulations 1996; Local Government and Rating Act 1997; Petroleum Act 1998; Lifting Operations and Lifting Equipment Regulations 1998; Quarries Regulations 1999; Mines (Control of Ground Movement) Regulations 1999; Constitutional Reform Act 2005; Employment Equality (Age) Regulations 2006; Coal Mines (Control of Inhalable Dust) Regulations 2007; Mines Regulations 2014; Deregulation Act 2015

Status: Partially repealed

Text of statute as originally enacted

Text of the Mines and Quarries Act 1954 as in force today (including any amendments) within the United Kingdom, from legislation.gov.uk.

The Mines and Quarries Act 1954 (2 & 3 Eliz. 2. c. 70) is an act of the Parliament of the United Kingdom that made fresh provision for the management and control of mines and quarries and for the safety, health and welfare of persons employed in them in England and Wales and Scotland.

== Provisions ==
=== Repealed enactments ===
Section 189 of the act repealed 23 enactments, listed in the fifth schedule to the act, and revoked regulation 60A of the Defence (General) Regulations 1939.

Fifth schedule — Enactments repealed
Citation	Short title	Extent of repeal
35 & 36 Vict. c. 77	Metalliferous Mines Regulation Act 1872	The whole act.
38 & 39 Vict. c. 39	Metalliferous Mines Regulation Act 1875	The whole act.
46 & 47 Vict. c. 31	Payment of Wages in Public-houses Prohibition Act 1883	In section two, the words from " nor any person " to the end of the section.
50 & 51 Vict. c. 19	Quarry (Fencing) Act 1887	The whole act.
50 & 51 Vict. c. 58	Coal Mines Regulation Act 1887	In section twelve, in subsection (1), the word " agent", wherever it occurs, and subsection (2). In section thirteen, in subsection (2), the word " agent " and the words " against this Act", in subsection (3) the word "agent", in subsection (4), the word " agent" wherever it occurs, in subsection (5), the word " agent" and, in subsection (8), the word " agent" and the words " against this Act "
57 & 58 Vict. c. 42	Quarries Act 1894	The whole act.
57 & 58 Vict. c. 52	Coal Mines (Check Weigher) Act 1894	In section one, the word " agent ", wherever it occurs, and the words "against the Coal Mines Regulation Act, 1887 ".
63 & 64 Vict. c. 21	Mines (Prohibition of Child Labour Underground) Act 1900	The whole act.
5 Edw. 7. c. 9	Coal Mines (Weighing of Minerals) Act 1905	In section one, in subsection (2), the word " agent ".
6 Edw. 7. c. 53	Notice of Accidents Act 1906	Sections one, two, three and five.
8 Edw. 7. c. 57	Coal Mines Regulation Act 1908	In section one, in subsection (3), the words " owner, agent or", in subsection (4), the words " owner, agent or ", in subsection (5), the words " owner, agent or " and, in subsection (7), the words " fireman, examiner or " in both places where they occur. In section two, in subsection (1), the words " owner, agent or "' and, in subsection (2), the words " owner, agent or ". In section three, in subsection (1), the words " owner, agent or" and, in subsection (2), the words " owner, agent or ". In section five, the words " owner, agent or ". In section six, the words "owner, agent or ". In section seven, in subsection (1), the words from the beginning to " Provided that", and subsection (2).
10 Edw. 7 & 1 Geo. 5. c. 15	Mines Accidents (Rescue and Aid) Act 1910	The whole act.
1 & 2 Geo. 5. c. 50	Coal Mines Act 1911	The whole act.
4 & 5 Geo. 5. c. 22	Coal Mines Act 1914	The whole act.
6 & 7 Geo. 5. c. 31	Police, Factories, &c. (Miscellaneous Provisions) Act 1916	Section ten.
10 & 11 Geo. 5. c. 50	Mining Industry Act 1920	Sections nineteen and twenty-one. In section twenty-five, the definitions of " owner", " agent " and " management ".
13 & 14 Geo. 5. c. 42	Workmen's Compensation Act 1923	Section twenty-eight.
16 & 17 Geo. 5. c. 28	Mining Industry Act 1926	Section twenty-one. In section twenty-three, in subsection (3), the word " agent " and, in subsection (4), the word " agent".
26 Geo. 5 & 1 Edw. 8. c. 22	Hours of Employment (Conventions) Act 1936	Section two.
1 Edw. 8 & 1 Geo. 6. c. 62	Coal Mines (Employment of Boys) Act 1937	The whole act.
1 Edw. 8 & 1 Geo. 6. c. 67	Factories Act 1937	In section one hundred and fifty-one, subsection (5). In section one hundred and fifty-eight, subsections (1) to (3).
6 & 7 Geo. 6. c. 6	Workmen's Compensation Act 1943	Section four.
12, 13 & 14 Geo. 6. c. 53	Coal Industry Act 1949	Part II. In section thirteen, in subsection (2), the words from " and the Coal Mines Acts, 1887 to 1943 " to the end of the subsection.

== Subsequent developments ==
Section 189 of, and the fifth schedule to, the act, were repealed by section 1 of, and part XXX of the schedule to, the Statute Law (Repeals) Act 1974, which came into force on 27 June 1974.
