= Coal Mines Regulation Act 1887 =

Act of the Parliament of the United Kingdom

Coal Mines Regulation Act 1887 (Note: Section 1.)
- Act of Parliament
- Parliament of the United Kingdom
- Long title: An Act to consolidate with amendments the Coal Mines Acts, 1872 and 1886, and the Stratified Ironstone Mines (Gunpowder) Act, 1881.
- Citation: 50 & 51 Vict. c. 58
- Territorial extent: United Kingdom

Dates
- Royal assent: 16 September 1887
- Commencement: 1 January 1888 (Note: Section 2.)
- Repealed: 1 January 1987 (Note: The Wages Act 1986 (Commencement) Order 1986 (SI 1986/1998).)
Other legislation
Amends	See § Repealed enactments
Repeals/revokes	See § Repealed enactments
Amended by	Coal Mines (Check Weigher) Act 1894; Coal Mines Regulation Act 1896; Mines (Prohibition of Child Labour Underground) Act 1900; Coal Mines Regulation Act (1887) Amendment Act 1903; Coal Mines (Weighing of Minerals) Act 1905; Employment of Women Act 1907; Statute Law Revision Act 1908; Coal Mines Act 1911; Coal Mines Act 1919; Mines and Quarries Act 1954; Weights and Measures Act 1963
Repealed by	Wages Act 1986
Relates to	Coal Mines Regulation Act 1908

Status: Repealed

Text of statute as originally enacted

The Coal Mines Regulation Act 1887 (50 & 51 Vict. c. 58) was an act of the Parliament of the United Kingdom that consolidated enactments related to the regulation of coal mines and certain other mines in the United Kingdom.

== Provisions ==
=== Repealed enactments ===
Section 84 of the act repealed 3 enactments, listed in the fourth schedule to the act.

Citation	Short title	Extent of repeal
35 & 36 Vict. c. 76	Coal Mines Regulation Act 1872	The whole act.
44 & 45 Vict. c. 26	Stratified Ironstone Mines (Gunpowder) Act 1881	The whole act.
49 & 50 Vict. c. 40	Coal Mines Act 1886	The whole act.

== Subsequent developments ==
The whole act except sections 1, 3, 12, 13, 14 and 15, were repealed by section 126 of, and the fourth schedule to, the Coal Mines Act 1911 (1 & 2 Geo. 5. c. 50), which came into operation on 1 July 1912.

Many provisions were subsequently repealed by the Mines and Quarries Act 1954 (2 & 3 Eliz. 2. c. 70).

The whole act was repealed by section 33(2) of, and part III of schedule 5 to, the Wages Act 1986, which came into force on 1 January 1987.
