= The Cry of the Children (poem) =

1843 poem by English writer Elizabeth Barrett Browning

"The Cry of the Children" is a poem by English writer Elizabeth Barrett Browning. It examines children's manual labor forced upon them by their exploiters. It was published in August 1843 in Blackwood's Magazine. This was shortly following the report into child labour by the Royal Commission of Inquiry into Children's Employment.

== Background ==
Browning wrote about contemporary topics, particularly liberal causes of her day. For instance, in "The Cry of the Children", Browning portrays children being underground the majority of their young lives, dragging wheelbarrows, and working long hours. The harsh conditions in which they are made to work can cause their lung and hearts to rapidly dysfunction. She uses lambs bleating in the meadows to represent the young children crying from whatever pains they must endure at the moment. Browning involves young animals to symbolize innocence and being put through both mental and physical pain for the satisfaction of an owner (1842). This encourages the reader to put themselves in that position to better understand how intense the conditions were.

Although The Cry of the Children is a 13 stanza poem it does not use the popular terza rima rhyme scheme (ABA BCB CDC DED) but rather an ABAB CDCD EFEF format. This is superior as it makes the poem's main idea straightforward. This leads readers to Browning's key point, the death of children because they are forced to work from a very tender age and they pray to God to be taken before their time of actual death (Beaming Notes, 2015). Browning best describes this in lines 51-52 as the children say “It is good when it happens, that we die before our time” and in lines 86-87 the children pray for the absurd noises to come to an end (Browning, 1842).
