= Norma Gregory =

British author, historian, archivist, broadcaster and diverse heritage specialist

- Born: Norma Jacqueline Gregory; 1969 (age 56–57); Mapperley, Nottingham, England
- Education: University of Nottingham; Institute of Education, University of London
- Occupations: Author, historian, archivist and broadcaster
- Known for: Founder of the Nottingham News Centre and the Black Miners Museum

Norma Jacqueline Gregory (born 1969) is a British author, historian, archivist, broadcaster and diverse heritage specialist of Jamaican descent. In 2013, she founded the Nottingham News Centre, focused on the preservation of heritage. She is a museum project consultant encouraging increased diversity of representation in British museums and the founder director of the Black Miners Museum.

== Early life and education ==
Norma Jacqueline Gregory was born in 1969 and raised in Mapperley, Nottingham, England. She is the daughter of Jamaicans who migrated to the UK in the 1960s. At school she experienced the lack of representation of marginalized people in the history curriculum. After working briefly as a model, and as a security guard at Harrods, Gregory enrolled in evening classes and completed a two-year radio and print journalist course in 1996. In 2004, she gained a postgraduate certificate in learning mentoring. After her degree in English language, Literature and Religious studies, she received a Post Graduate Certificate of Education (PGCE) from the University of Nottingham, followed in 2005 by a Master of Arts from the Institute of Education, University of London.

== Career ==
Gregory was employed for some years as a secondary-school teacher, mentor and higher education lecturer in London and Nottingham. In 2013 she founded the Nottingham News Centre, a Community interest company (CIC) aimed at gaining, preserving and passing on information about heritage. She led a project to collate the history of the Nottingham Carnival. In October 2014, she instigated the placing of a blue heritage plaque in Nottingham for the entrepreneur and former slave George Africanus and later launched the George Africanus Society, UK.

In 2015, Gregory published Jamaicans in Nottingham: Narratives and Reflections. The book highlights the historical presence in Nottingham of people with Jamaican heritage. Examples are George Africanus (c 1763–1834), a former West African enslaved person who went on to be a successful entrepreneur, and Cecile Wright, a professor and researcher at the University of Nottingham. The book includes two chapters on coal miners. After failing to find many other resources on black coal miners, Gregory set out to research and curate an exhibition at the National Coal Mining Museum in Wakefield, Yorkshire, called Digging Deep: Coal Miners of African Caribbean Heritage. The exhibition was on tour from 2018 onwards. Gregory also set up the Black Miners Museum in 2013.

== Publications ==
- Jamaicans in Nottingham, Narratives and Reflections
- An Introduction to Sharing and Celebrating Diverse Industrial Heritage
- Crooked Carousel: Selected Poetry (Nottingham News Centre Publishing, 2016)

== Directorships ==
- The National Coal Mining Museum for England. (2018–2020)
- UNESCO, Nottingham City of Literature (2018)
- Nottingham News Centre CIC (2013–)

== Awards ==
In 2000, Gregory was awarded the Millennium Commission Award for her Black British Poets media project. In 2016, she won the Black Achievers’ Award (Nottingham) in the Category for Arts, Culture & Music (Best Female).

Gregory was presented with the Alumni Laureate Award from the University of Nottingham in 2017 for her dedication to heritage and community education. In 2018, Gregory received a Windrush Award (Nottingham), the Inspirational Leadership Award.

More recently, in November 2023 she was voted Women's Champion of the Year in the Women's Leadership category for her work with the Nottingham News Centre at the Social Enterprise Awards UK. The following December, she was awarded an honorary Doctorate of Letters by the University of Nottingham. Also in 2023, Nottinghamshire County Council gave Gregory the Pride of Gedling Award Best Community Project for her Digging Deep exhibition.
