= Royal Commission of Inquiry into Children's Employment =

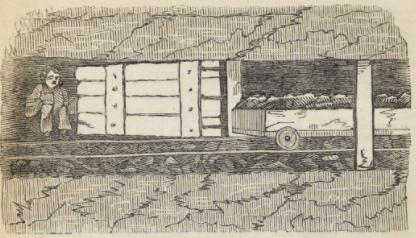
Illustration of a child trapper from the Children's Employment Commission report

The Royal Commission of Inquiry into Children's Employment was established by the UK Parliament. They conducted hundreds of interviews primarily with children, not merely about their working conditions but also as regards what education they received and their day-to-day diet. They published their report in 1842, which ultimately led to the passage of the Mines and Collieries Act 1842.

Anthony Ashley-Cooper, 7th Earl of Shaftesbury, set up the commission and Richard Henry Horne compiled the report. On publication, public opinion was shocked and it inspired a variety of protest literature by such writers as Benjamin Disraeli, Elizabeth Gaskell, Elizabeth Barrett Browning (The Cry of the Children) and Charles Dickens.
