= Mines and Collieries Act 1842 =

Act of the Parliament of the United Kingdom concerning mining

- Act of Parliament
- Parliament of the United Kingdom
- Long title: An Act to prohibit the Employment of Women and Girls in Mines and Collieries, to regulate the Employment of Boys, and to make other Provisions relating to Persons working therein.
- Citation: 5 & 6 Vict. c. 97
- Territorial extent: United Kingdom

Dates
- Royal assent: 9 June 1843
- Commencement: 9 June 1843 (Note: Section 1.)
- Repealed: 1 January 1873
Other legislation
Amended by	Mines Regulation Act 1860
Repealed by	Coal Mines Regulation Act 1872; Metalliferous Mines Regulation Act 1872

Status: Repealed

Text of statute as originally enacted

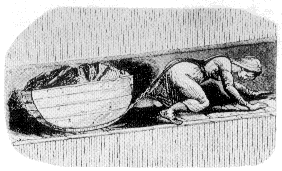
This illustration of a drawer (a type of hurrier) pulling a coal tub was originally published in the Children's Employment Commission (Mines) 1842 report.

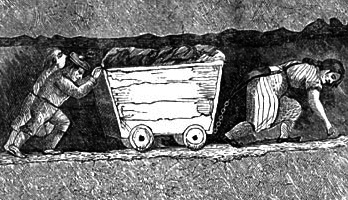
A hurrier and two thrusters heaving a corf full of coal as depicted in the 1853 book The White Slaves of England by J Cobden.

The Mines and Collieries Act 1842 (5 & 6 Vict. c. 99), commonly known as the Mines Act 1842, was an act of the Parliament of the United Kingdom. The act forbade women and girls of any age to work underground and introduced a minimum age of ten for boys employed in underground work. It was a response to the working conditions of children revealed in the 1842 report by the Royal Commission of Inquiry into Children's Employment. The Commission was headed by Anthony Ashley-Cooper, Member of Parliament (styled Lord Ashley at the time).

At the beginning of the 19th century, methods of coal extraction were primitive and the workforce of men, women, and children, laboured in dangerous conditions. In 1841 about 216,000 people were employed in the mines. Women and children worked underground for 11 or 12 hours a day for lower wages than men. The public became aware of conditions in the country's mines in 1838 after an accident at Huskar Colliery in Silkstone, near Barnsley. A stream overflowed into the ventilation drift after violent thunderstorms causing the death of 26 children; 11 girls aged 8 to 16 and 15 boys between ages 9 to 12. The disaster came to the attention of Queen Victoria who ordered an inquiry.

In 1840 Lord Ashley headed the Royal Commission, which investigated the conditions of workers —especially children — in the coal mines. Commissioners visited collieries and mining communities gathering information and evidence (sometimes against the mine owners' wishes). Compiled by Richard Henry Horne, the report, accompanied by illustrations (most of them by the artist Margaret Gillies) and the personal accounts of mineworkers was published in May 1842. Victorian society was shocked to discover that children as young as five or six worked as "trappers", opening and shutting ventilation doors down the mine, before becoming "hurriers", pushing and pulling coal tubs and corfs. Lord Ashley deliberately appealed to Victorian prudery, focussing on girls and women wearing trousers and working bare-breasted in the presence of boys and men, which "made girls unsuitable for marriage and unfit to be mothers" – such an affront to Victorian morality ensured the bill was passed.

Lord Londonderry, a coal-mine owner, opposed the bill in the House of Lords and pushed through amendments that watered it down. The bill passed the House of Lords at its third reading on 1 August 1842.

Even before the act, the underground employment of women in most forms of metal mines was rare, but it did take place much more frequently in iron ore mines which were thus impacted by the act.

== Results of the act ==
- No females could be employed underground.
- No child under 10 years old was to be employed underground.
- Parish apprentices between the ages of 10 and 18 could continue to work in the mines

== Bibliography ==
- House of Lords, 1842. Parliament of the United Kingdom.
- Davies, Alan (2006). The Pit Brow Women of the Wigan Coalfield. Tempus. ISBN 0-7524-3912-X.
