= Glossary of rail transport terms =

Rail transport terms are a form of technical terminology applied to railways. Although many terms are uniform across different nations and companies, they are by no means universal, with differences often originating from parallel development of rail transport systems in different parts of the world, and in the national origins of the engineers and managers who built the inaugural rail infrastructure. An example is the term railroad, used (but not exclusively) in North America, and railway, generally used in English-speaking countries outside North America and by the International Union of Railways. In English-speaking countries outside the United Kingdom, a mixture of US and UK terms may exist.

Various terms, both global and specific to individual countries, are listed here. The abbreviation "UIC" refers to terminology adopted by the International Union of Railways in its official publications and thesaurus.

For more elaborate country-specific guides, see Glossary of United Kingdom railway terms and Glossary of North American railroading.

== A ==
Acorn.
A general term used to finish the ends of rods of various forms.
Adhesion railway
The most common type of railway, where power is applied by driving some or all of the wheels of the locomotive.
Adhesive weight
The weight on the driving wheels of a locomotive, which determines the frictional grip between wheels and rail, and hence the drawbar pull a locomotive can exert
Adjusting spring
A heavy spiral spring or nest of springs used for controlling the side motion of a two-wheel radial trailing truck.
Adjusting spring case

A cylindrical cast-iron holder in which an adjusting string is placed.
Adjusting spring seat
A casting, or a part of the bolster of a two-wheel trailing truck, forming a bearing for the end of the adjusting spring.
Admission
The opening of steam port to admit steam to one end of a cylinder. If the valve has no lead, admission takes place at the moment the piston of its stroke and just as it is to begin the return stroke.
Air brake

Any brake operated by air pressure, but usually restricted to systems of continuous brakes operated by compressed air, in distinction from Vacuum Brakes, which are operated by creating a vacuum. The air is compressed by some form of steam pump on the locomotive, or a motor-compressor on electric locomotives, and is conveyed by pipes and flexible hose between the engine, tender and cars to cylinders and pistons under the tender and each car, by which the pressure is transmitted to the brake levers, and thence to the brake shoes. This system is what is now termed the straight-air brake. This brake is now obsolete in steam road practice, having been replaced by the Automatic Air Brake.
Air brake hose
Flexible tubes made of alternate layers of rubber and canvas by which the brake pipes under engines, tenders, and cars are connected together, and compressed air, which operates the brakes, conducted through the train. The hose is made with a coupling at each end of the engine and tender so that it can readily be connected or disconnected. Also called air hose and brake hose.
Air cylinder (air pump)
A cylinder forming part of the air brake pump and having its piston fastened to the same rod to which the piston of the steam cylinder is fastened. It is furnished with air inlet and discharge valves at each end, communicating respectively with the air inlet and the discharge pipe.
Air cylinder bracket
A projecting piece of metal bolted to the frame of a locomotive or tender, to which the brake cylinder is attached. See Truck Brake, Tender Brake.
Air cylinder gasket
See Gasket.
Air cylinder oil cup (air pump)
A small brass receptacle with a stopcock or faucet, screwed to the air cylinder of an air pump, to hold a supply of lubricant for the air cylinder. See Automatic Air Cylinder Oil Cup.
Air drum

A cylindrical reservoir, made of sheet steel, into which air is pumped and stored for use in the air brake system and train air signal line. Sometimes placed under the cab deck or between the frames in front of the guide yoke; but now two are commonly used, placed under the running board near the cab, one on each side of the engine.
Air drum hanger
An iron strap riveted to the lower side of the running board, or to the boiler, to support the air drum.
Air drum head
The end of the air drum, to which the cylindrical body is riveted or welded.
Air drum saddle
A strip of iron fastened to the locomotive frame for supporting the air drum or drums when the drums are placed between the cylinder saddles and the guide yoke.
Air gauge (air brake)
A gauge to register the pressure of air in the reservoirs, brake pipe, or brake cylinders, similar to an ordinary steam pressure gauge. They are made either with a single pointer or with two pointers, to indicate on one dial both the reservoir pressure and the brake pipe pressure. The latter type is called a duplex gauge.
Air gage fitting
A pipe connection by means of which an air gauge is connected to an engineer's brake valve in a locomotive cab.
Air gauge stand
A bracket or support to hold an air gauge.
Alerter or watchdog
Similar to the dead man's switch other than it does not require the operator's constant interaction. Instead, an alarm is sounded at a preset interval in which the operator must respond by pressing a button to reset the alarm and timer if no other controls are operated. If the operator does not respond within a preset time, the prime mover is automatically throttled back to idle and the brakes are automatically applied.
All-weather adhesion
The adhesion available during traction mode with 99% reliability in all weather conditions
Alternator
An electrical generator that converts mechanical energy to electrical energy in the form of alternating current
American Locomotive Company (Alco)
The second largest builder of steam locomotives in the United States
American type
A steam locomotive with a 4-4-0 wheel arrangement.

The American wheel arrangement

Angle cock
A valve affixed to each end of a piece of rolling stock that, when opened, admits compressed air to the brake pipe (or vents it to the atmosphere if air hose is detached)
Annett's key
A large key which locks levers or other items of signalling apparatus, thereby serving as a portable form of interlocking
Articulated locomotive
A steam locomotive with one or more engine units that can move relative to the main frame
Articulated vehicles (articulation)
The sharing of one truck by adjacent ends of two rail vehicles.
Ashpan
A feature of a locomotive with the same form and purpose as the domestic variety (i.e. to collect the ashes that fall through the bars of the grate). The only significant difference is the size, measured in feet rather than inches.
Asynchronous motor
An alternating current electric motor whose speed varies with load and has no fixed relation to the frequency of the supply.
Atlantic type

The Atlantic wheel arrangement

A steam locomotive with a 4-4-2 wheel arrangement.
Automatic block signaling (ABS)
A system that consists of a series of signals that divide a railway line into a series of blocks and then functions to control the movement of trains between them through automatic signals.
Automatic train control (ATC)
A system that applies an emergency brake if the driver does not react to certain signals or speed restrictions
Automatic train operation (ATO)
A technology for automation of trains.
Automatic train protection (ATP)
A system that enforces obedience to signals and speed restrictions by speed supervision, including automatic stop at signals
GWR Autotrain
A branch-line train consisting of a steam locomotive and passenger carriages that can be driven from either end by means of rodding to the regulator and an additional vacuum brake valve. The fireman remains with the locomotive and, when the driver is at the other end, the fireman controls the cut off and vacuum ejectors in addition to his usual duties. See also: Push–pull train.

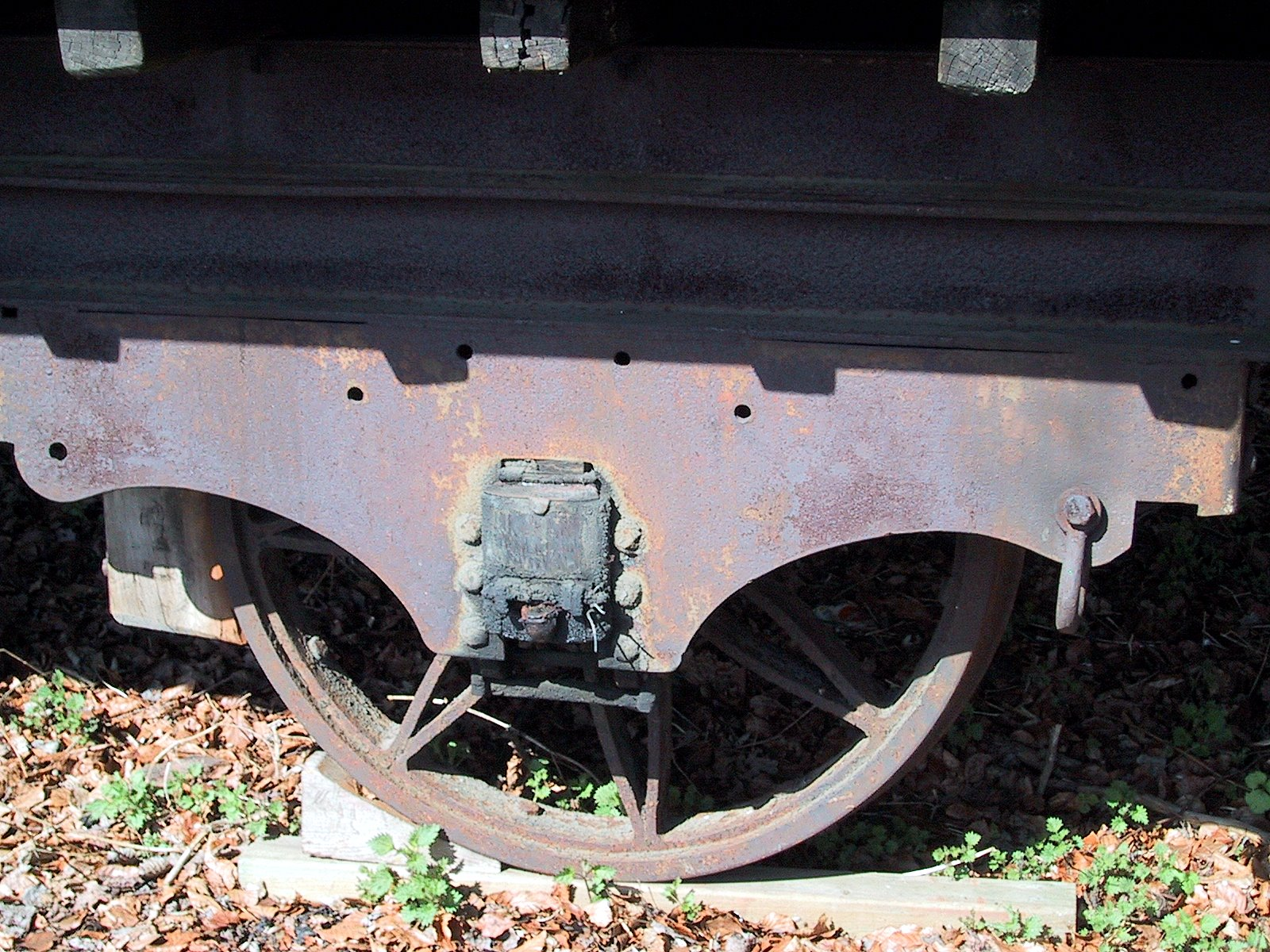
A Swiss axle box

Axlebox
The housing that holds the axle bearings on a rail vehicle The housing that attaches to the end of the axle to the bogie and contains the bearing on which the axle rotates See also journal box below.

== B ==
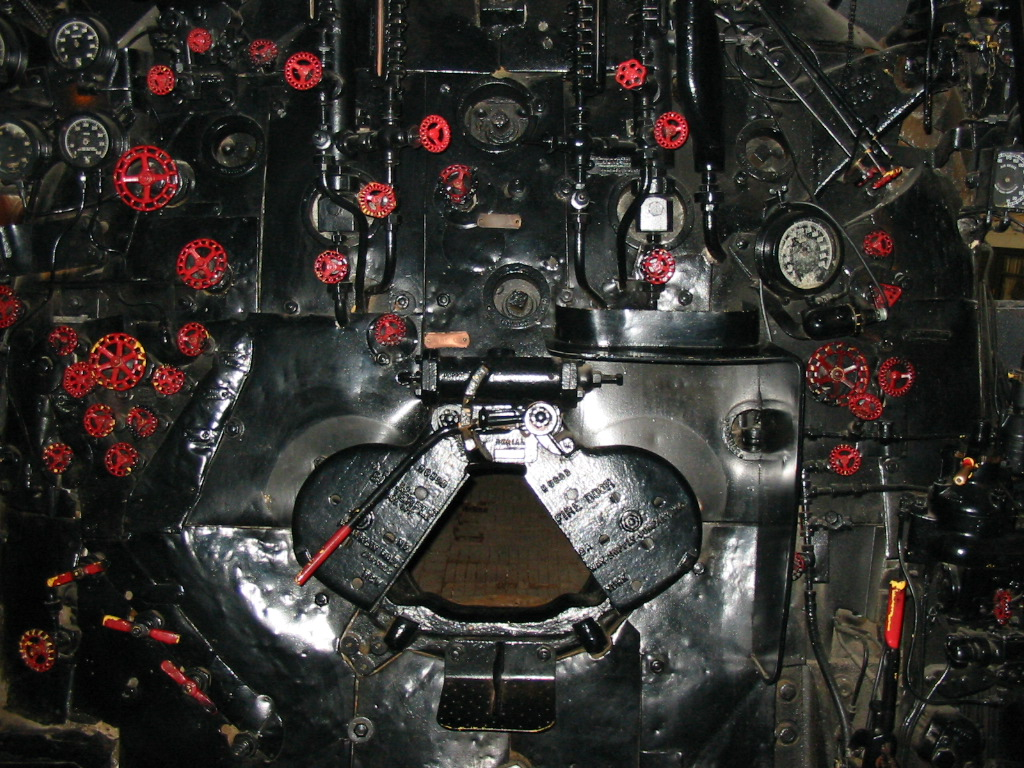
The backhead of UP 4017, a locomotive at the National Railroad Museum in Green Bay, Wisconsin

Backhead
The cab-side rear panel of a steam locomotive boiler through which the firebox is accessed.

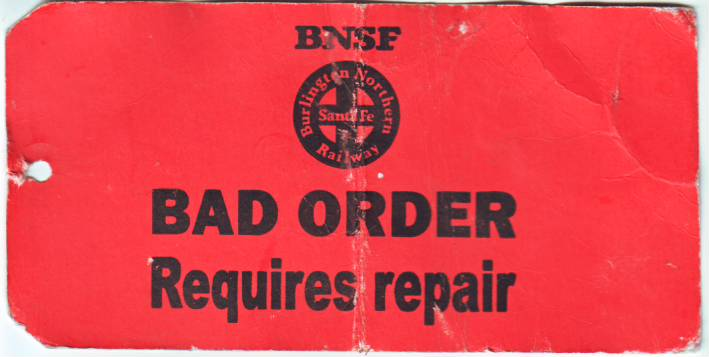
An example of a BNSF Railway bad order repair tag

Bad order
A tag or note applied to a defective piece of equipment. Generally, equipment tagged as bad order must not be used until repaired, inspected, and approved for use.
Bail off
To release the locomotive brakes while the train brakes are applied, to permit smoother handling and prevent excessive slack, wheel slide and flat wheels.
Balancing
The reciprocation and revolving masses of any steam, diesel or electric locomotive need balancing, if it is to work smoothly. Revolving masses can easily be balanced by counterweights, but the balancing of reciprocating parts is a matter of compromise and judgement.
Balise
A transponder that is used as an intermittent data point in an automatic train protection (ATP) system or as reference point for train location in radio-based train control
Ballast
Aggregate stone, gravel, or cinders forming the track bed on which sleepers (ties) and track are laid to ensure stability and proper drainage
Ballast tamper
See Tamping machine.
Balloon
A looped length of track, usually at the end of a spur or branch, which trains use to turn around for the return trip without reversing or shunting. Can be used as part of a freight installation to allow the loading or unloading of bulk materials without the need to stop the train (see merry-go-round train (MGR)).
Bay platform
A platform and track arrangement where the train pulls into a siding, or dead-end, when serving the platform.
Bellmouth
A widening of an underground rail tunnel, in preparation for future connection or expansion of service. Used particularly in subway nomenclature.

The Berkshire wheel arrangement

Berkshire type
A steam locomotive with a 2-8-4 wheel arrangement.
Bilevel rail car
A type of rail car that has two levels of passenger accommodation, as opposed to one, increasing passenger capacity.
Blastpipe
A part of a steam locomotive that discharges exhaust steam from the cylinders into the smokebox beneath the chimney to increase draught through the fire.
Block section
A section of track in a fixed block system that a train may only enter when it is not occupied by other vehicles.
Bo-Bo (Europe)
A locomotive with a four-wheel, two wheels per truck configuration, each individually powered, as opposed to a six-wheel "Co-Co" configuration.
Bogie
A swivel-mounted wheel assembly; known as a Truck in North America.
Boiler
A cylindrical container adjacent to the firebox in which steam is produced to drive a steam locomotive.
Bolster
A transverse floating beam member of a truck suspension system supporting the weight of a vehicle body.
Boom barrier

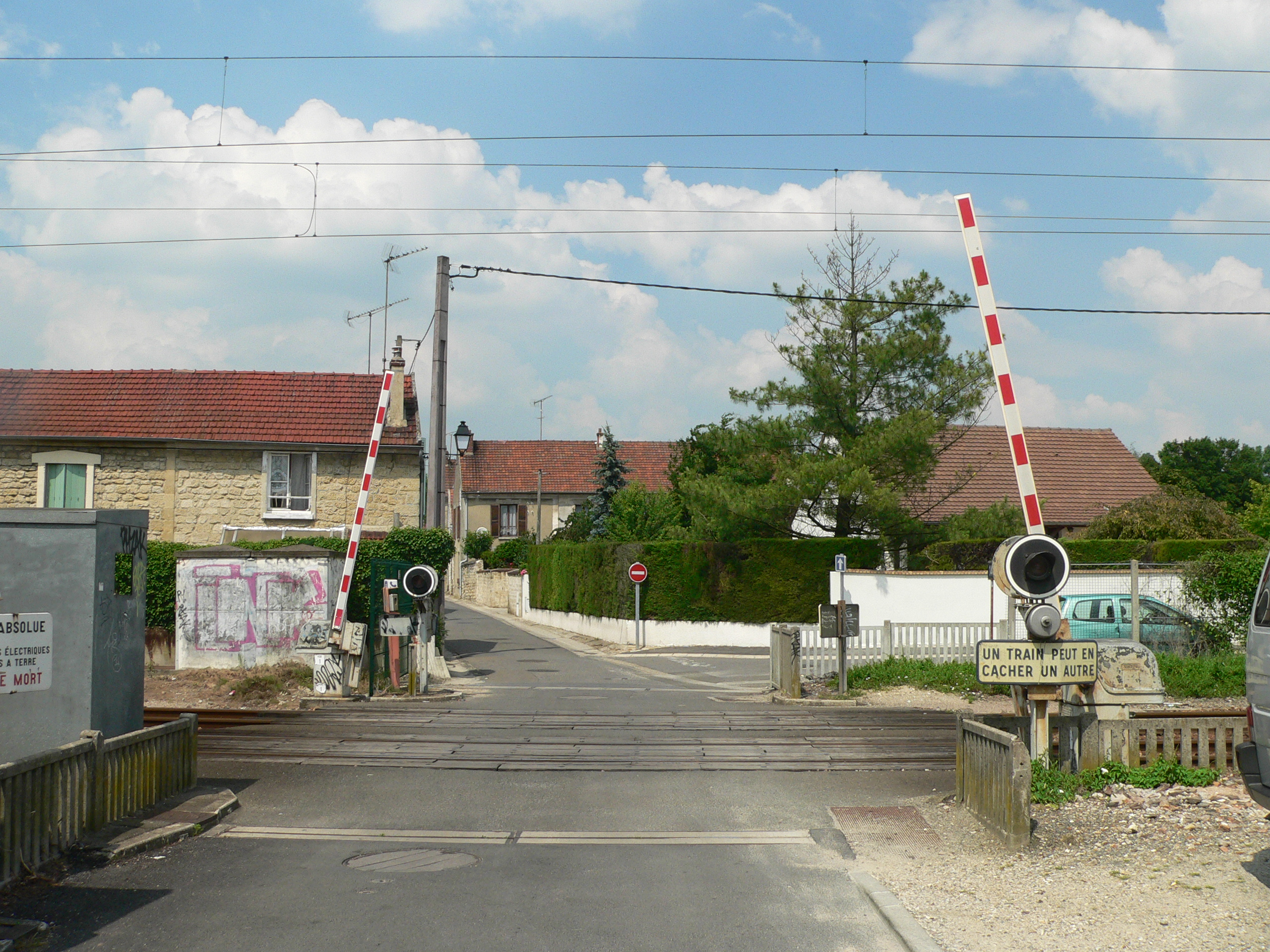
Boom barriers at a railway crossing in France

A pivoted road barrier at a level crossing
Booster engine
An extra set of cylinders that can be engaged on a steam locomotive to drive a trailing truck or tender truck to give additional tractive effort at starting and low speeds
Brakeman's cabin or brakeman's cab
A small hut at one end of a railway wagon to protect the brakeman from the elements.
Brake pipe
The main air pipe of a train's air brake system
Branch line
A secondary railway line that splits off from a main line
Brick arch
A brick or concrete baffle provided at the front of a locomotive firebox below the tubes to extend the flame path. Early locomotives burned coke; provision of a brick arch was necessary before coal could be used without producing excessive smoke.
British Rail Universal Trolley Equipment (BRUTE)
A type of platform trolley found on stations all over the UK rail network from the late 1960s to the early 1980s.
Broad gauge
Track where the rails are spaced farther apart than standard gauge, or 1,435 mm (4 ft 8 1/2 in)
Bubble car
A nickname for a British Rail Class 121 railcar
Buckeye coupler
A side-operated version of the top- or bottom-operated Janney coupler
Buffer
A device that cushions the ends of rail vehicles against each other.
Buffer stop or bumper post
The barrier installed at the end of a dead-end track to prevent rail vehicles from proceeding further.
Builder's plate
The nameplate fitted by their manufacturer to locomotives and items of rolling stock.
Bulkhead flatcar
An open-top flatcar with a wall at each end.
Bungalow
The housing for signals and communications computers that control switches, crossings, and other such controls, relaying information to and from the rail traffic control (RTC)
Bustitution
A blend of the words "bus" and "substitution", the practice of replacing a train service with one provided by buses, whether as a temporary or a permanent measure.

== C ==
Cab
The control room of a locomotive housing the engine crew and the controls
Cab forward
A steam locomotive with its cab at the leading end of the boiler, rather than the usual trailing end adjacent to the tender. The best known example is the Southern Pacific Railroad's AC type, built to handle drag freights through the SP's many tunnels and snow sheds without the danger of the exhaust asphyxiating the engine crew.
Cabless
A locomotive without a cab. Commonly referred to as a B unit or a Slug, although not all Slugs are cabless.
Caboose

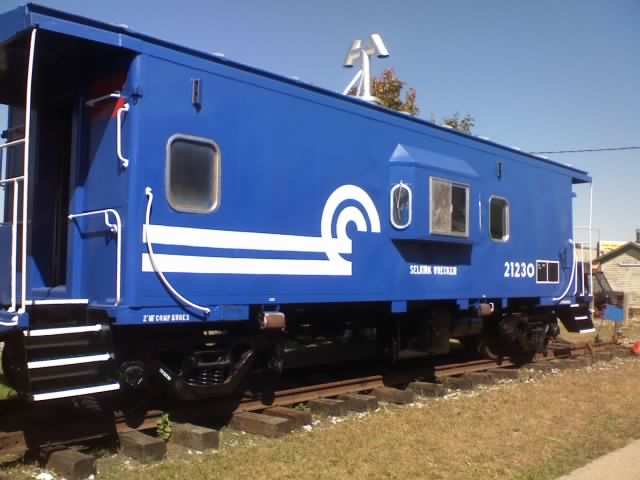
A caboose on display at the National New York Central Railroad Museum

In North America, a railroad car attached usually to the end of a train, in which railroad workers could ride and monitor track and rolling stock conditions. Largely obsolete, having been replaced by the electronic end-of-train device (ETD), or flashing rear-end device (FRED).
Cant
The angle of an individual rail relative to vertical (e.g. around curves).
Carbody unit
A locomotive that derives structural strength from a bridge-truss design framework in the sides and roof, which cover the full width of the locomotive.
Catenary

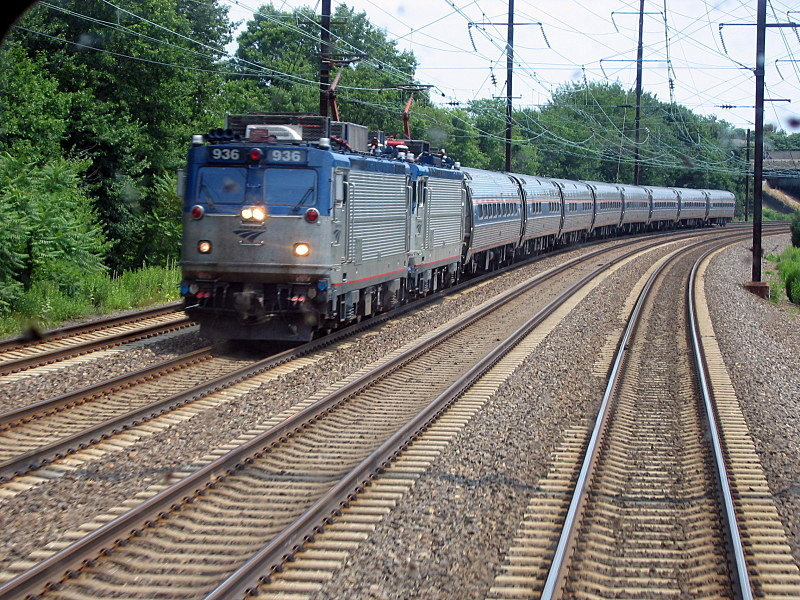
A catenary is visible above this electric Amtrak train.

The overhead wire system used to send electricity to an electric locomotive or multiple unit, tram or light rail vehicle
Centerbeam
A bulkhead flatcar with a braced beam bisecting its length, used to transport lumber products
Challenger type

The Challenger wheel arrangement

A steam locomotive with a 4-6-6-4 wheel arrangement.
Chord
A section of subsidiary track that interconnects two primary tracks that cross at separated grades, to permit traffic to flow between them.
Co-Co locomotive (EU)
A heavier duty locomotive with six wheels, three wheels per truck (all axles being separately driven) configuration as opposed to a four-wheel "Bo-Bo" configuration. The correct classification is Co'Co', but Co-Co is used more often.
Coal pusher
A steam-operated device in the tender intended to push coal forward to a point where it can be shovelled directly into the fire.
Colour light signal
A signal in which the colour of the light determines the signal meaning.
Colour position signal
A signal that uses both colour and light position to indicate meaning.
Combined power handle
A handle or lever that controls both the throttle and dynamic braking on the locomotive: on a desktop-type control stand, forward (away from operator) past center operates the dynamic brake, backward (toward operator) past center, is throttle up.
Compound locomotive
A steam locomotive passing steam through two sets of cylinders. One set uses high pressure steam, then passes the low pressure exhausted steam to the second.
Configurable System
Capability of the system to allow users to select, from pre-programmed functions (modular software units), those functions necessary to accomplish a control strategy or other complex function, without the use of computer language.
Consist
Single vehicle or a group of vehicles that are not separated during normal operation.
Consolidation type

The Consolidation wheel arrangement

A steam locomotive with a 2-8-0 wheel arrangement.
Container on flat car (COFC)
The loading of a shipping container onto a simple flat car.
Continuous welded rail (CWR)
A form of track made from rails welded together by a thermite reaction or flash butt welding to form one continuous rail that may be several kilometres long.
Control car
A passenger coach with a full set of train controls at one end, allowing for the use of push–pull train operation.
Control System
The microprocessor based control and fault diagnostic system has been developed for conventional electric locomotives including locos provided with static converter. It performs logical control of the locomotive by continuously monitoring various digital/ analog inputs and checks for any abnormality in the operation.
Coupler pulling faces, length over
Effective length of piece of rolling stock
Coupling rods
Rods between crank pins on the wheels, transferring power from a driving axle to a driven axle of a locomotive.
Covered goods wagon (UIC)
A type of rolling stock with a flat bottom enclosed on all sides and top, which is loaded and unloaded from sliding doors on each side.
Cow–calf or cow and calf
A diesel locomotive with a crew cab permanently coupled to and acting as a controller for a similar slave diesel locomotive without a crew cab, primarily used for switching or shunting duties for large groups of rolling stock. Also known as master and slave.
Crank pin
A pin protruding from a wheel into a main or coupling rod.
Crosshead
In a steam locomotive, the moving member of a sliding guide that absorbs upward and downward forces from the connecting (main) rod, which otherwise would tend to bend the piston rod.
Cut
To uncouple one or more cars from a train (i.e. to "make a cut").
Same as "cutting"
Cut lever
A manual lever that releases the pin of an automatic coupler when pulled to separate cars or locomotives.
Cut off

A variable device on steam locomotives that closes the steam valve to the steam cylinder before the end of the piston stroke, thus conserving steam while letting steam in the cylinder expand under its own energy.
Cutting
A channel dug through a hillside to enable rail track to maintain a shallow gradient. See also embankment.
Cycle braking
Making repeated service brake reductions in short succession to maintain a constant speed on short but steep grades. With the brake systems commonly used on North American freight railroads, each reduction must be at least 5 PSI lower than the previous one to keep the brakes applying regularly, but excessive cycle braking can deplete the air supply and require an emergency application. Also referred to as "fanning the brakes" in North America.
Cylinder
A cavity in a reciprocating engine in which a piston travels.
Cylinder cock
On steam locomotives, crews use this appurtenance to drain water from the steam cylinders when the throttle is open, thus preventing damage to the pistons, running gear, and cylinder heads.

== D ==
Dark signal
A block signal that is displaying no discernible aspect, often due to burned out lamps or local power failure. Most railroads require that a dark signal be treated as displaying its most restrictive aspect (e.g. stop and stay for an absolute signal).
Dark territory
A section of track without block signals.
Dead-end rail
A railway ending in a locality (terminus) with no other rail services. Typically includes buffer stops at the end of the tracks. The opposite of rail crossing
Dead man's handle
A safety mechanism on a train controller that automatically applies the brake if the driver releases the handle. It is intended to stop a train if the driver is incapacitated. In some forms, this device may be pedal-actuated. See also Dead-man's vigilance device.
Decapod type

The Decapod wheel arrangement

A steam locomotive with a 2-10-0 wheel arrangement.
Defect detector
A track side device used to detect various defects such as hotboxes (overheated axle bearings), dragging equipment, leaning cars, overloaded cars, overheight cars, seized (locked) wheels, etc.
Degraded operation
Operation resulting from an unplanned event that prevents the normal delivery of train services.
Demurrage
A monetary charge levied by a railroad to a customer for excessive delay in loading or unloading cars.
Derail or derailer
A safety device that derails vehicles that pass it, typically to prevent rolling stock from accidentally entering the mainline from a siding.
Detonator

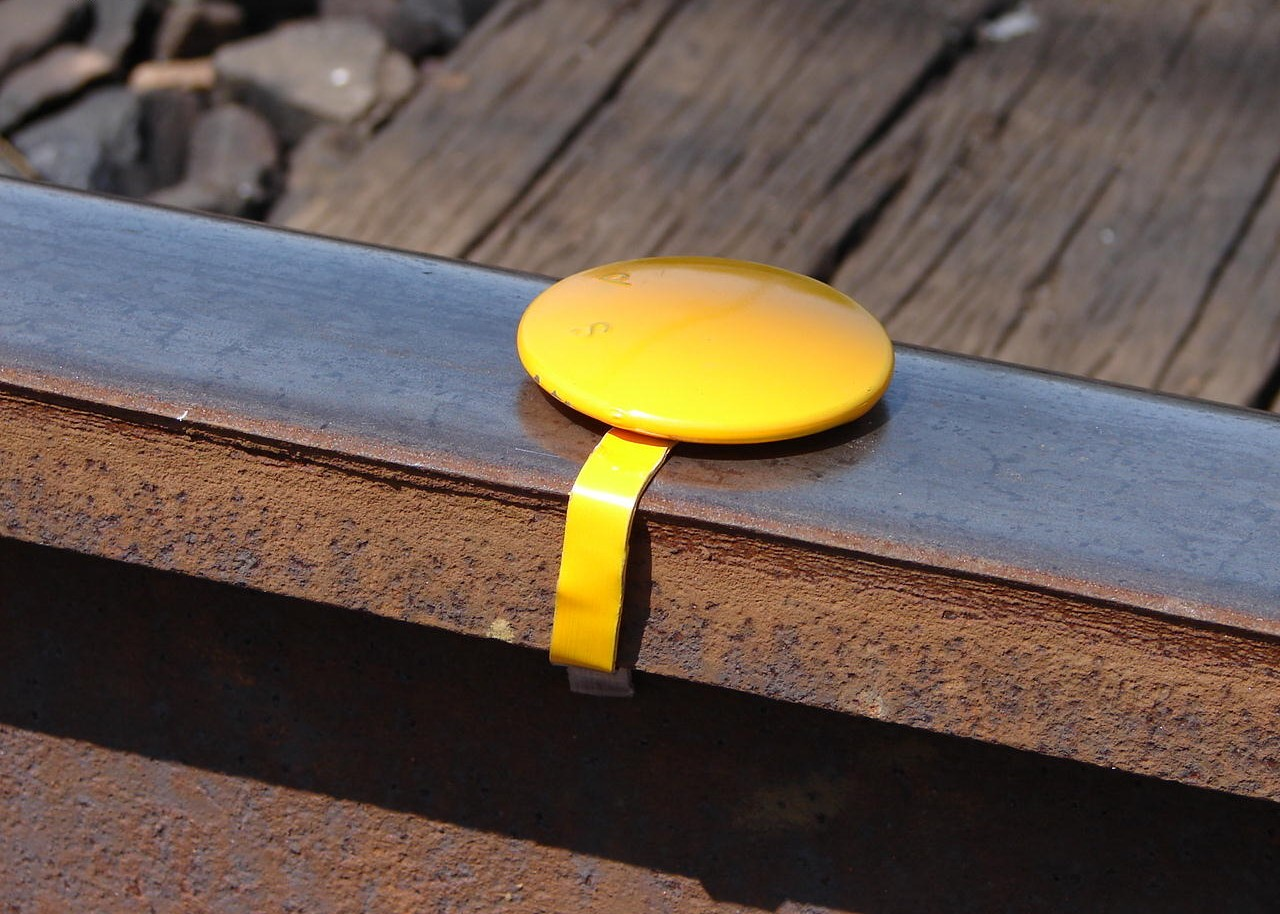
A detonator on a rail

A small explosive charge placed on the running rail, which detonates loudly when run over to warn drivers in following trains of an incident ahead. Known as a torpedo in the United States.
Diamond

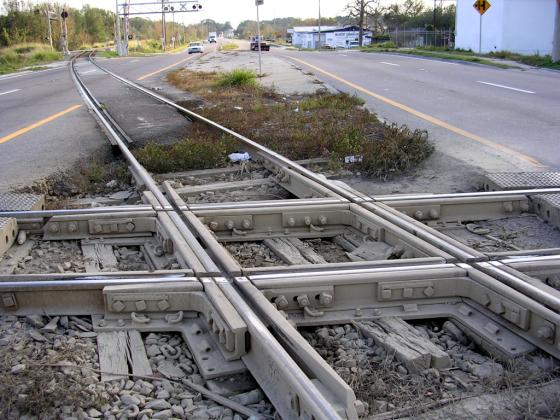
A railroad crossing at grade, also known as a diamond

Track that lets a rail line cross another at grade
Diesel multiple unit (DMU)

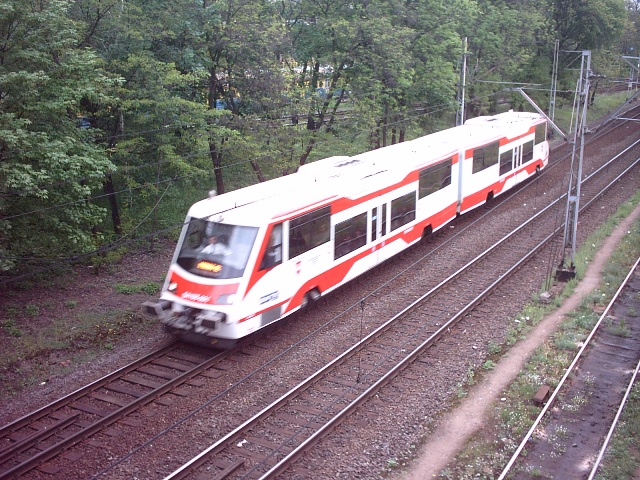
A diesel multiple unit in Poland

A set of diesel-powered self-propelling passenger rail vehicles able to operate in multiple with other such sets. Such units, especially those consisting of a single vehicle, are sometimes termed railcars.
Direct traffic control (DTC)
A system in which train dispatchers communicate directly with train crews via radio to authorize track occupancy in predefined blocks.
Distributed power
A practice originally used to move large trains through the mountains. Now commonly used to facilitate longer, heavier trains in all types of terrain. Consists of the locomotives on the head end, a "swing" (mid-train) helper or two, and pusher locomotive(s) on the rear; today, all units are remotely controlled by the engineer in the lead unit. The remote locomotives are referred to as Distributed Power Units (DPUs). The power distribution alleviates stress on the couplers and relieves the lead units of the full weight of the train, making it easier to move on grades.
Ditch lights

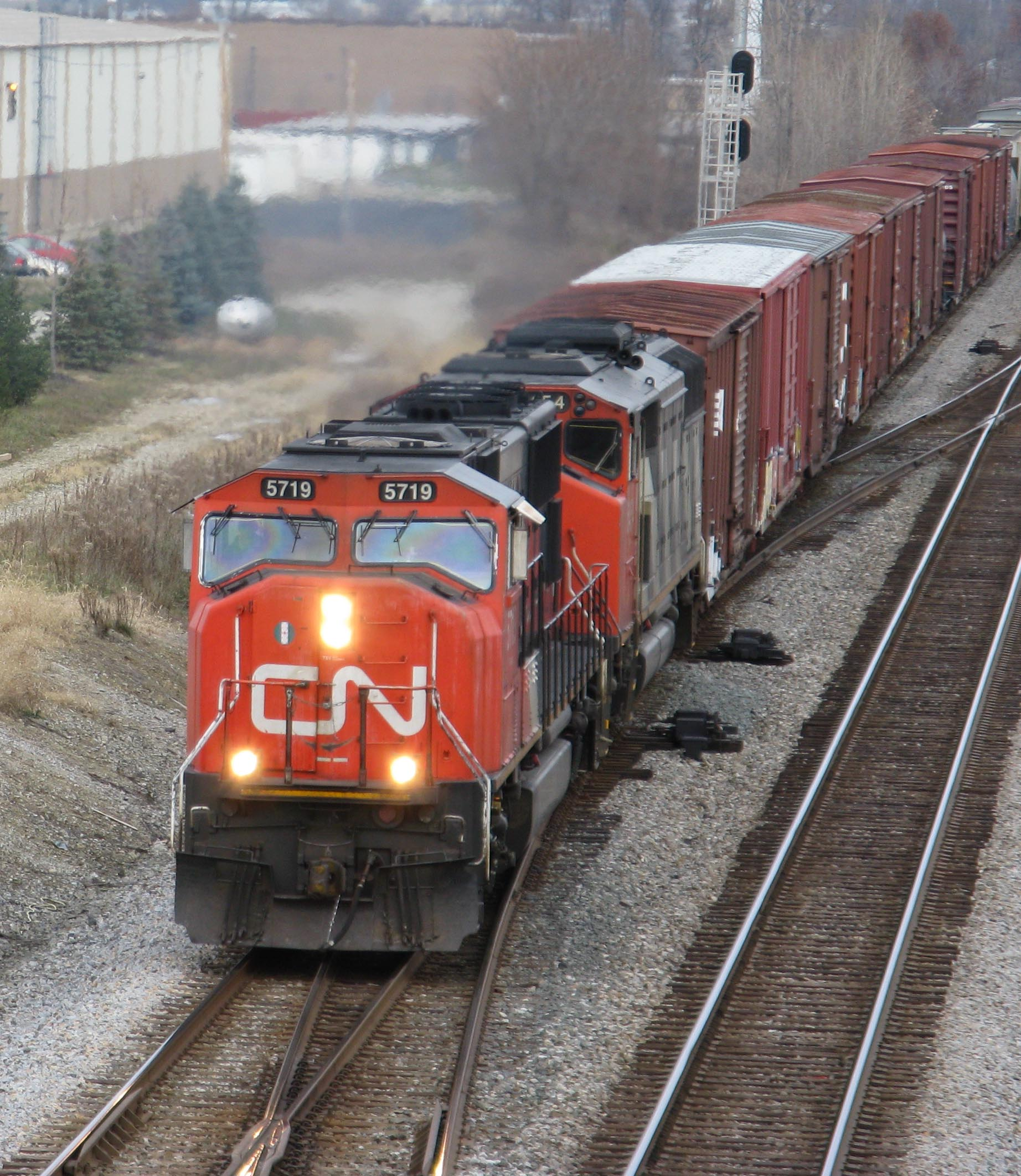
A Canadian National Railway train showing the placement of ditch lights on the locomotive

A pair of lights, usually found on modern locomotives, located some distance below and outboard of the main headlight. They may also flash alternately when a locomotive sounds its horn.
Division
In North America, the trackage area under the jurisdiction of a railway superintendent.
Dog or dogspike (India)
A spike with a slightly altered head shape for easier extraction when the spike has become too loose in the sleeper.
Doodlebug
A self-powered gasoline–electric passenger car used for small-capacity rural commuter service. Also a British Rail Class 153 DMU.
Double
If a train has insufficient power to climb a grade and no helpers are available, the crew splits the train into two sections and runs them separately to the top.
Double heading
A configuration in which two locomotives are coupled head-to-tail so they can haul a heavy train up a long or steep hill. Currently, double heading (and occasionally triple heading) are used primarily by large passenger trains or as a show for railfans.
Drag
A long, heavy freight train moving at low speed.
Dragging equipment detector
See Defect detector.
Drawbar
The part of a coupler that attaches to the frame of the car or locomotive; may be equipped with a pneumatic cushion depending on a freight car's design cargo (e.g. an autorack). Alternately, the pinned double bars coupling a steam locomotive to its tender.
Driver or engine driver
The operator of a locomotive.
Driver only operation (DO or DOO)
Operation of a train by the engineer or driver only. Also known as one person train operation (OPTO)
Driver
A wheel in contact with the rail that also propels a locomotive
Dual control stand
the practice of having two control stands (a "control stand" is a diesel locomotive subsystem which integrates all engine and brake functional controls within the operational radius of the locomotive engineer's left forearm from his/her customary seating position, facing forward at all times) in the cab of a hood unit locomotive, one on either side facing opposite directions to allow operation either long hood or short hood forward at all times.
Dwarf signal
A signal light that is considerably smaller and closer to the ground than a high-mast signal; often absolute, and placed within interlocking limits, its aspects tend to differ from those conveyed by a taller signal for certain indications. Also called 'pot' or 'jack'.
Dwell time
The time a train spends at a scheduled stop without moving. Typically, this time is spent boarding or deboarding passengers, but it may also be spent waiting for traffic ahead to clear, or idling time in order to get back on schedule.
Dynamic braking
The use of a traction motors' output, working as generators, to retard train speed without relying solely on the air brakes.

== E ==
Ejector
A component of vacuum brake system usually fitted in pairs. Steam passing through a cone sucks air from the train pipe to create the vacuum.
A small ejector running continuously to overcome leaks and to restore the vacuum after light braking and a large ejector operated when needed to release the brakes quickly after a heavy application or to create the initial vacuum after coupling
Electric multiple unit (EMU)
A set of electrically powered self-propelling passenger rail vehicles able to operate in multiple with other such sets.
Electro-Motive Diesel (EMD)
The world's second largest builder of railroad locomotives. EMD was previously Electro-Motive Division of General Motors before being sold.
Elevated railway, el, or L
A railway built on supports over city streets.
Embankment
A bank, usually of earth but sometimes of stone, constructed to form a level or minimally graded trackbed for a line of railway needing to pass over a depression in the terrain or other pre-existing surface feature. See also cutting.
Empty coaching stock (ECS)
A train used to bring carriages into (or out of) service. They usually run between sidings and main stations, with the carriages then forming a service train to another destination. They are often worked under freight train rules (e.g. without needing a guard in the UK).
Emergency release
A device accessible under certain conditions that permits the operation of an apparatus in case of failure.
End-cab switcher
A switching locomotive with no short hood, thus having its cab forming one end of its car body.
Engineer
In North America, the operator of a locomotive.
Equalizing reservoir
A small air reservoir in a locomotive control stand. When the automatic brake valve is operated, this reservoir responds by reducing or increasing the air pressure in the brake pipe.
Event recorder
A device that continuously captures analog and digital train systems information and stores that data for a minimum of 48 hours. This data is used to evaluate incidents and accidents. Typical stored data includes speed, brake pressure, dynamic brake, horn activation, track signal, etc. In the U.S., event recorders are mandated by the Federal Railroad Administration (FRA) for freight, passenger and commuter rail. Regulations for railroads outside the U.S. vary by country. Transit operations are not generally required to have event recorders, but have begun to add them voluntarily.
Express train
A train that passes selected stations without stopping.
Extra
A train not included in the normal schedule of a railroad. They often run during busy holiday travel periods in order to handle larger crowds and reduce the number of passengers waiting or stranded at a station. In train order territory, extras are required to clear the main line for scheduled trains to pass.

== F ==
Facing
A turnout that can select which way to diverge a train—the opposite of trailing.
Fairlie
A type of articulated locomotive, typically (but not exclusively) with two boilers and connected fireboxes in a central cab.
Fall plate
A heavy, hinged steel plate attached in a horizontal position to the rear of the locomotive footplate or front of a locomotive tender. When the tender is attached to its locomotive the plate is allowed to fall to cover the gap in the "floor" between the two units. The sliding edge is not fixed and has a smooth chamfer so as to avoid a trip hazard.
Fallen flag
An abandoned or bankrupt railroad or one absorbed by another company that loses its historic name.
Feedwater heater
A device to preheat the water for a steam locomotive to improve efficiency.
Feed valve or regulating valve
A valve that controls the amount of air pressure channelled from the locomotive's main reservoir to the brake pipe, in accordance with the set pressure in the equalizing reservoir.
Fiddle yard
In railway modelling, a concealed group of sidings used to provide more realistic operation in a limited space.
Firebox
In steam locomotives, a chamber in which a fire produces sufficient heat to create steam once the hot gases created there are carried into the adjacent boiler via tubes or flues.
Fireman, stoker, or boilerman
A worker whose primary job is to shovel coal into the firebox and ensure that the boiler maintains sufficient steam pressure.
Flat
A wheel defect where the tread of a wheel has a flat spot and is no longer round; flats can be heard as regular clicking or banging noises when the wheel passes by. This is caused either by a locked bearing, or a brake that was not fully released before the car was moved, dragging the wheel without turning.
Flying junction or flyover
A railway junction that has a track configuration in which merging or crossing railroad lines provide track connections with each other without requiring trains to cross in front of opposing traffic on the same level
Fouling point
A point of a switch turnout where a car or locomotive on one track obstructs movements on the adjacent track.
Four-quadrant gate

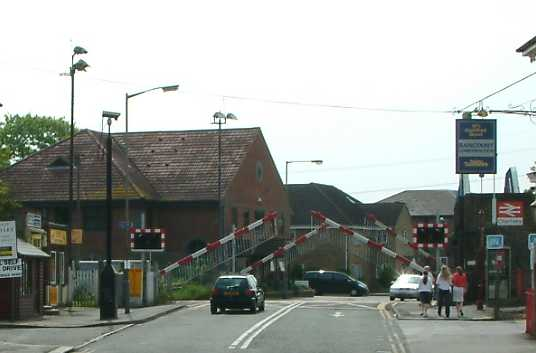
Four-quadrant gates rising

A type of boom barrier
Free-mo
A type of modular layout in model railroading.
Freight wagon (UIC)
A rail vehicle designed for the carriage of freight.
Full service reduction

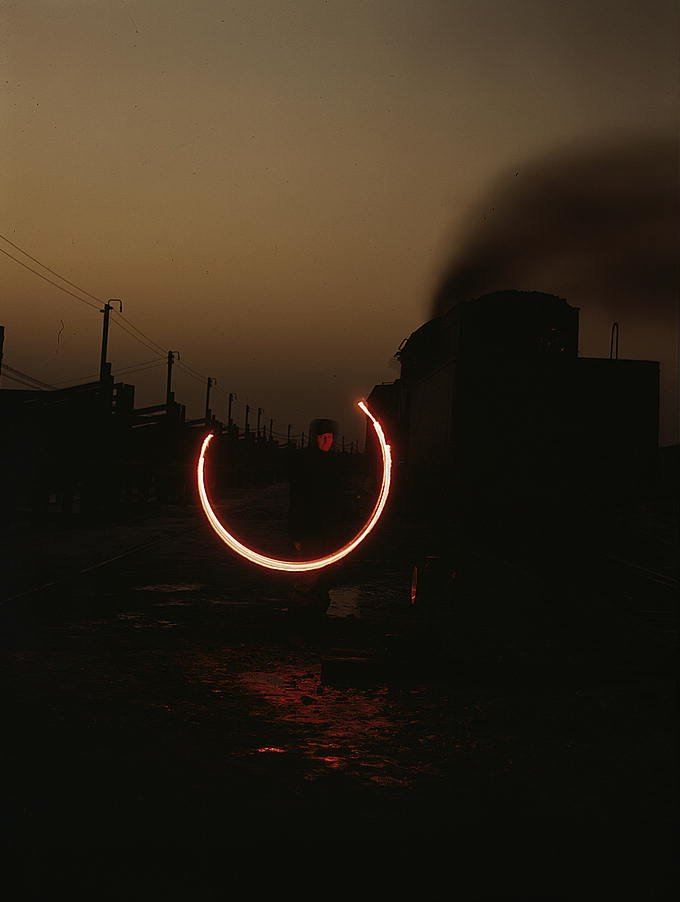
A brakeman uses a fusee to demonstrate a hand signal indicating "stop"

The maximum air pressure that can be exerted against brake pistons in a normal brake application. To increase pressure beyond this point, the brakes must be placed in emergency.
Fusee
A pyrotechnic device similar to an automotive flare that is used in signalling.
Fusible plug
A threaded plug, with a soft metal core, that is screwed into the crown plate of a firebox. If the water level gets too low the core melts and the noise of the escaping steam warns the enginemen.

== G ==
Garratt locomotive

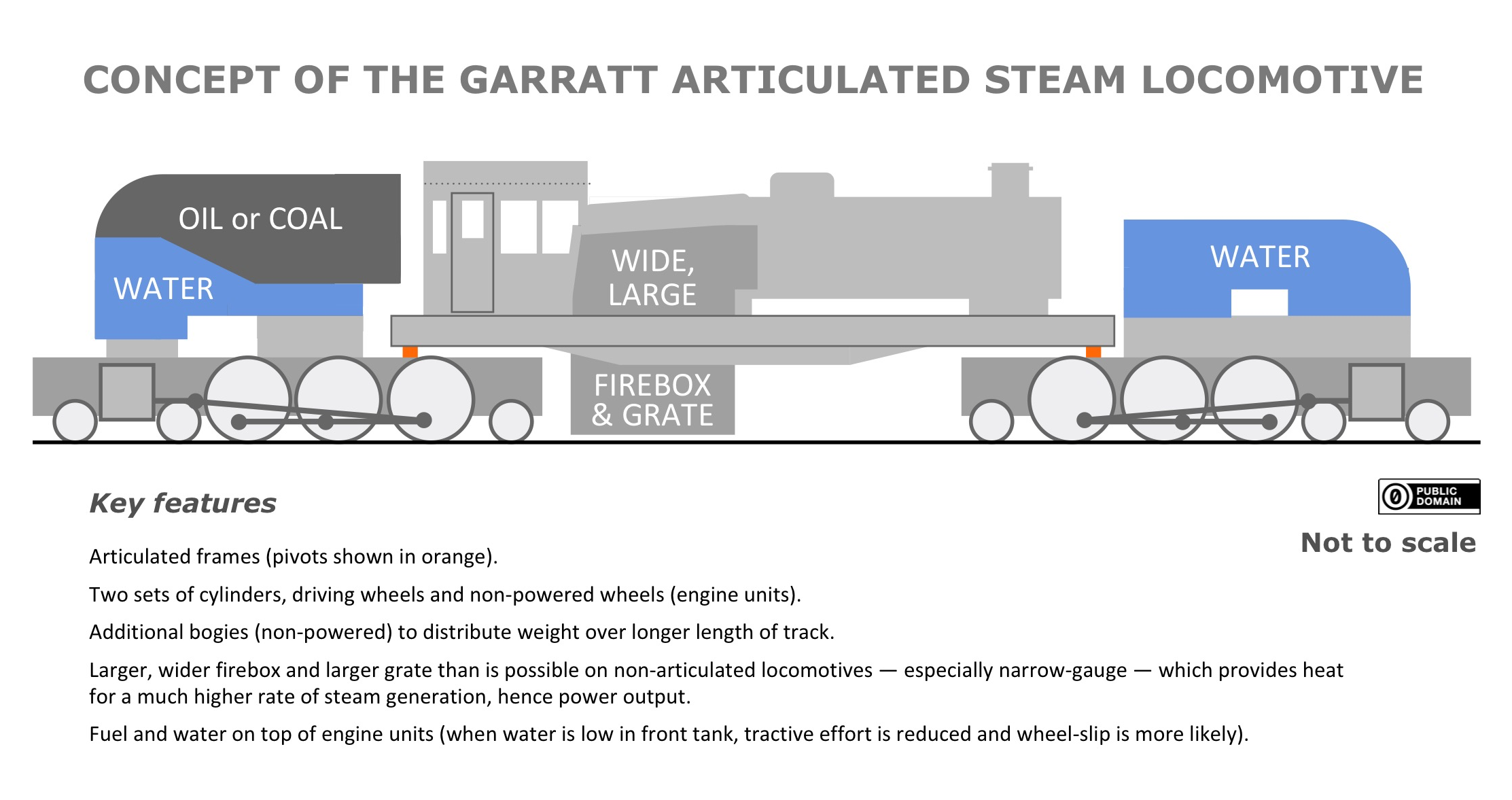
Concept of the Garratt locomotive

A type of steam locomotive that is articulated into three parts
Gauge
The width between the inner faces of the rails.
Geep

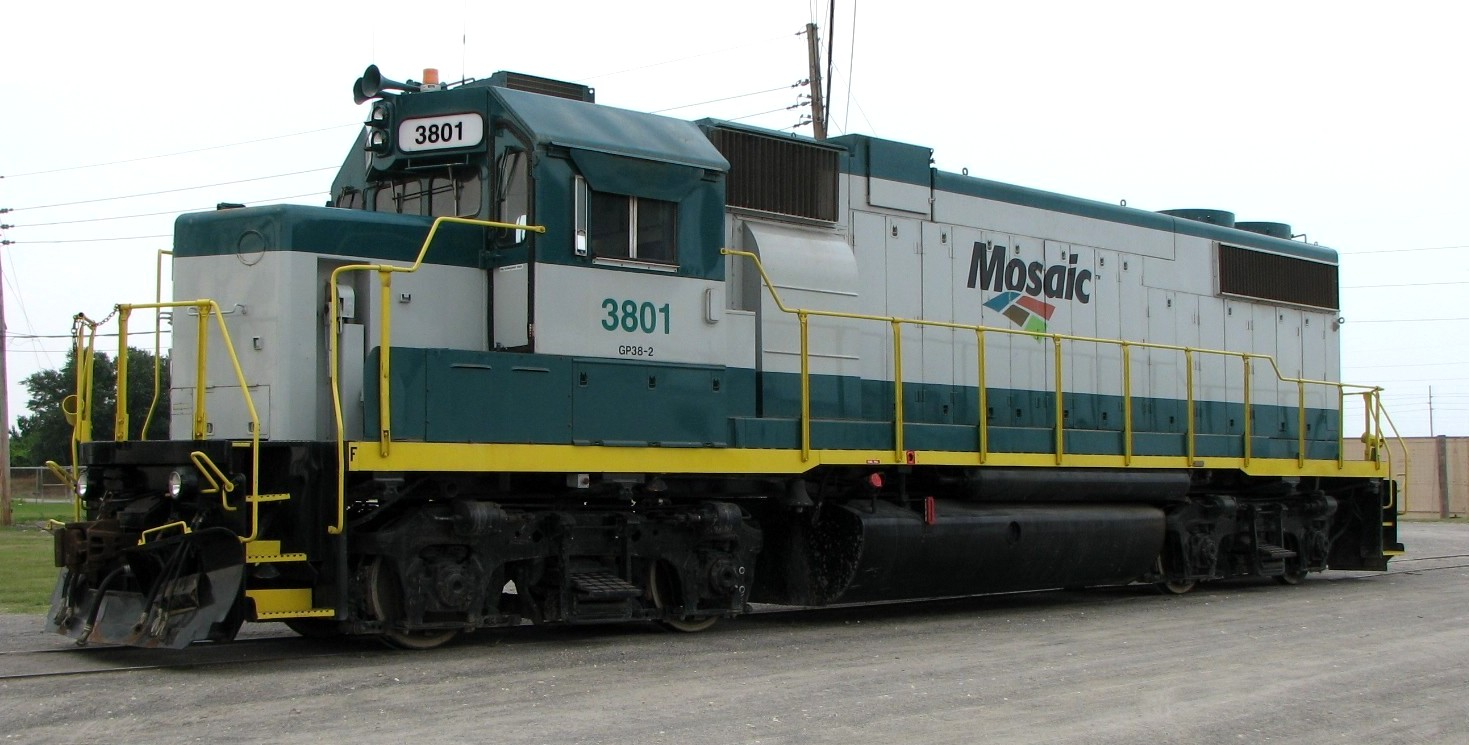
An EMD GP38-2, "General Purpose" (GP) locomotives are often called a "Geep"

Any of the GP ("general-purpose") series of Electro-Motive four-axle diesel locomotives; originally applied only to EMD GP7, GP9, and GP18 models
Generator field
The control switch of a diesel–electric locomotive that opens or closes the circuit between the main generator and the traction motors.
Get a knuckle
To break a train in two, usually by shearing the knuckle pin in a coupler, often caused by the application of excessive head end power at startup.
GEVO
A nickname for General Electric's Evolution series of modern diesel locomotives.
Gladhand connector
A quick coupling and uncoupling connector at the end of a trainline air hose that resembles a pair of shaking hands when hoses are connected.
Go-devil
A hand-powered railroad car (see Handcar and Draisine), or a small gasoline powered railroad car.
Grab bar or Grab iron
A handle on the side of a car to allow switching personnel to hold on.

== H ==
Harmonic rock or harmonic rock and roll
The condition of locomotives and cars swaying in opposite directions when traversing depressions on the roadbed. A potentially dangerous condition that can cause coupler damage, lading damage, or derailments at slower speeds.
Head-End Power
A scheme whereby the locomotive engine or a separate generator provides hotel power to carriages
Headboard
A sign attached to a locomotive to identify a named train or charter, or for other special occasions
Headstock
A transverse structural member located at the extreme end of a rail vehicle's underframe. The headstock supports the coupling at that end of the vehicle, and may also support buffers, in which case it may also be known as a "buffer beam".
Heavy haul
Heavy freight operations
High rail
The upper rail in a curve or superelevation, which typically experiences higher lateral loads and greater wear
Hole
A passing siding. Inferior trains "lay over in the hole" to let superior ones pass.
Home signal
See absolute signal.
Horn blocks
Plates lining the axlebox cut-outs in a locomotive frame to allow smooth vertical movement under control of the springs
Hostling
The action of shuttling a locomotive from the yard to the engine house or vice versa
Hotbox
An axle bearing that has become excessively hot due to friction
Hotbox detector
A device attached to the track that monitors passing trains for hot axles, and reports results via radio transmission (typical in the US) or a circuit to the signal box (typical in the UK). See defect detector.
Hudson type

The Hudson wheel arrangement

A steam locomotive with a 4-6-4 wheel arrangement
Hump
A raised section in a rail sorting yard that allows operators to use gravity to move freight railcars into the proper position within the yard when making up trains of cars. This is faster and requires less effort than moving cars with a switching engine.
Hunting
Swaying motion of a railway vehicle or bogie caused by the coning action on which the directional stability of an adhesion railway depends. The truck or bogie wanders from side to side between the rails, "hunting" for the optimum location based on the forces at play.

== I ==
Independent brake or locomotive brake
The braking system that applies or releases the brakes of a locomotive independently from its train
Infill station or in-fill station
A train station built on an existing passenger line to address demand in a location between existing stations
Injector
A device to force water into a steam locomotive's boiler by steam pressure
Insulated rail joint (IRJ) or insulated block joint (IBJ)
Rail joints incorporating insulation to isolate individual track circuits
Interchange
Any track or yard where rail cars are transferred from one carrier to another
Interlocking
An arrangement of switches and signals interconnected in a way that each movement follows the other in a proper and safe sequence
Intermodal freight transport
Moving goods by more than one type of vehicle, often achieved using shipping containers that are transferred among railroad flatcars, ships, airplanes, and tractor-trailer trucks
Intermodal passenger transport
Moving people by more than one type of vehicle
Interoperability
Ability of a transport network to operate trains and infrastructures to provide, accept and use services so exchanged without any substantial change in functionality or performance
Island platform
A railway platform that has tracks along the full lengths of both sides
Island railway station
A railway station with a station building on an island platform

== J ==
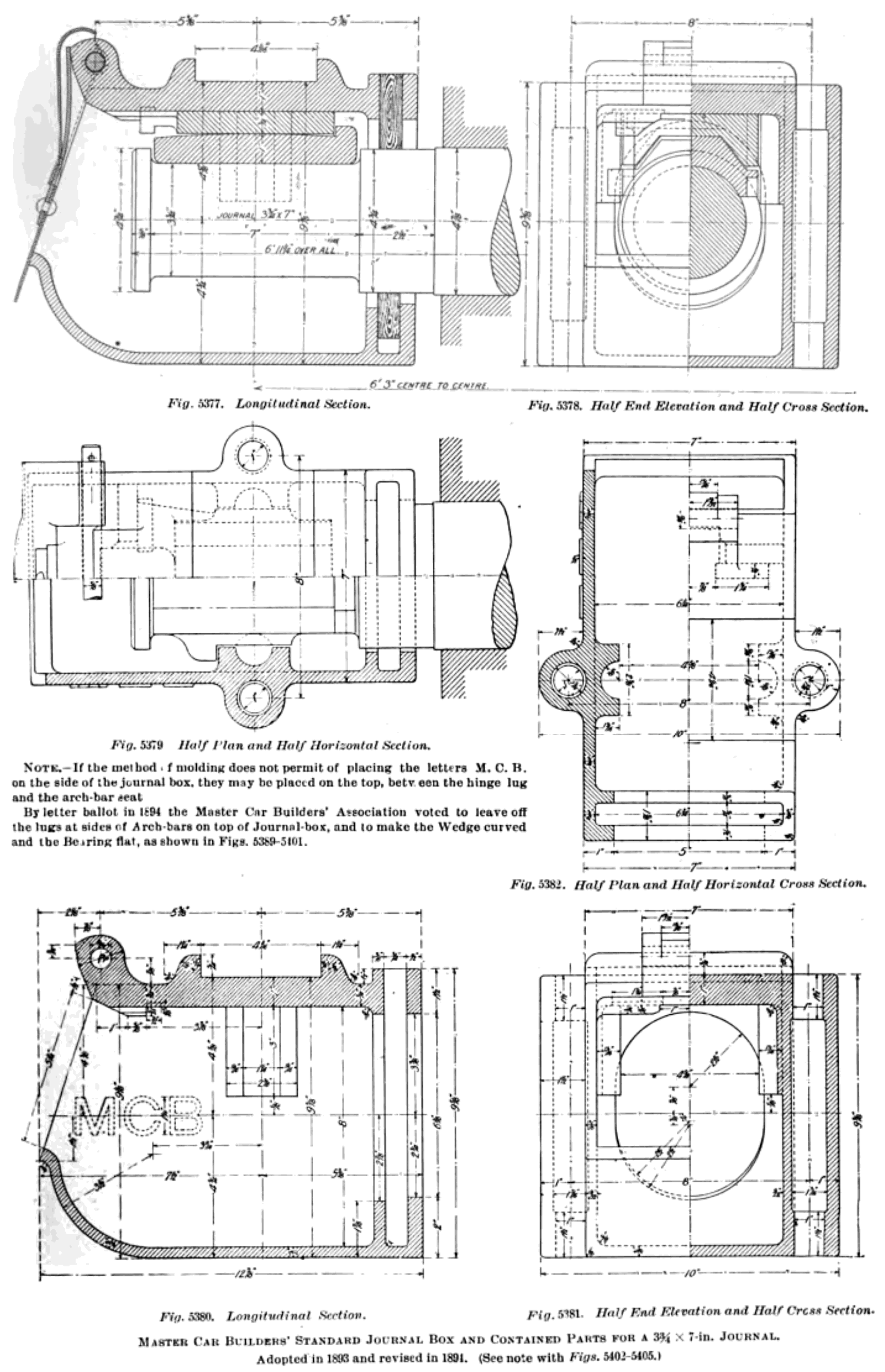
A journal box complete with bearing and journal

Jacobs Bogie
A Bogie, or truck (American), shared between two pieces of rolling stock. Cars joined with Jacobs bogies are semi-permanently joined in an articulated configuration. A weight-saving feature used on lightweight passenger trains.
Joint bar or rail joiner
A metal plate that joins the ends of rails in jointed track
Jointed track
Track in which the rails are laid in lengths of around 20 m and bolted to each other end-to-end by means of fishplates or joint bars
Journal bearing
A bearing without rolling elements; a plain bearing
Journal box
The housing of a journal bearing. See also Axlebox above.
Jubilee type

The Jubilee wheel arrangement

A steam locomotive with a 4-4-4 wheel arrangement
Junction
A point at which two lines or separate routes diverge from each other

== K ==
Keeper
A padlock or hook securing the lever of a hand-operated switch, thereby preventing the switch points from moving as rolling stock passes over them
Kick
To shove a car a short distance and uncouple it in motion, allowing it to roll free under gravity and/or its own inertia onto a track. Commonly practiced in bowl or hump yards to make up or break down trains or classify large numbers of cars in an expedient fashion. Differs from a flying switch in that the locomotive is pushing the car rather than pulling it when the cut is made.
Kicker
A freight car with a defect in its brake valve that causes the entire train's brake system to go into emergency when any application is made
Kinematic envelope (KE)
The outline of the space beside and above the track that must be kept clear of obstructions for the train to pass. This can be larger than the static clearance around an unmoving engine or car. See also: loading gauge and structure gauge
Knuckle
The articulating part of a coupler that locks automatically in its closed position to join rail cars; so named because its movement resembles that of the human finger

== L ==
Lead track
A non-main track from which several others branch within a short distance, such as within a rail yard or engine terminal
Level crossing (LC), railroad crossing, railway crossing, train crossing, or grade crossing
A crossing on one level ("at-grade intersection")—without recourse to a bridge or tunnel—generally of a railway line by a road or path. Not to be confused with non-dead-end railways (see Rail crossing)
Light engine
A locomotive travelling on its own, or perhaps with just a caboose (brake van) attached
Light rail
A city-based rail system based on tram design standards that operates mostly in private rights-of-way separated from other traffic but sometimes, if necessary, mixed with other traffic in city streets. Light rail vehicles (LRVs) generally have a top speed of around 55 mph (89 km/h) though mostly operating at much lower speeds, more akin to road vehicles.
Link and pin
An obsolete method of coupling rail cars, consisting of manually dropping the coupling pin into the drawbar as the cars joined. Extremely hazardous to the brakemen of its day, it was outlawed in the United States by the Railroad Safety Appliance Act of 1893.
Local train
A train that stops at most, if not all, stations along its route
Lunar
An off-white color of railway signal light, like the Moon, achieved by the use of a clear lens of very light blue, to make it distinct from a light that has a broken lens.

== M ==
Maglev
A system of high speed train transportation that uses two sets of magnets: one set to repel and push the train up off the track, and another set to move the elevated train ahead, taking advantage of the lack of friction.
Main generator
The electric generator in a diesel–electric locomotive that is coupled directly to the prime mover and feeds electrical energy to the traction motors
Main reservoir
The compressed-air tank of a locomotive containing source air for the brakes and other pneumatic appliances
Mallet locomotive
A type of compound articulated locomotive designed by the Swiss mechanical engineer Anatole Mallet (pronounced "mallay"). See Compound engine.
Manifest
An express freight train carrying a variety of general merchandise
Mars Light
A nose-mounted mechanically oscillated light used to warn traffic of an approaching locomotive. Functionally replaced by ditch lights on modern locomotives.
Mechanical semaphore signal
A signal in which the aspect is conveyed by moving an arm
Meet
In rail transport operations, a meet occurs when two trains arrive at a location and pass each other on parallel tracks, such as on a siding, usually in opposing directions. This is also sometimes referred to as a crossing of two trains.
Mikado type

The Mikado wheel arrangement

A steam locomotive with a 2-8-2 wheel arrangement
Milk train
In the U.S., milk trains ran from the countryside to cities making numerous stops at minor depots to pick up cans of fresh milk, making them a colloquial expression for a very slow train.
In the U. K., an aggregator for transporting milk from farms to dairies, such as British Railways Milk Trains; as these trains invariably ran very early in the morning, "milk train" became a colloquialism for a particularly early train.
Modalohr
An inter-modal car
Mogul type

The Mogul wheel arrangement

A steam locomotive with a 2-6-0 wheel arrangement
Mothballed
A track that is still serviceable but no trains are running on them.
Mountain type

The Mountain wheel arrangement

A steam locomotive with a 4-8-2 wheel arrangement
Mud ring
The bottom of the water space surrounding a steam locomotive's firebox that collects solids precipitating from the water supply during the boiling process
Multiple aspect signalling
A system of colour-light signalling in which signals may show three or four aspects
Multiple unit (MU)
A self-propelled rail vehicle that can be joined with compatible others and controlled from a single driving station. The names of the sub-classes of this type of vehicle, diesel multiple unit (DMU), diesel–electric multiple unit (DEMU) and electric multiple unit (EMU), are more common terms. These may also be termed railcars.
Multiple-unit train control
The control of multiple locomotives or MUs from a single set of controls.

== N ==
Comparison between standard gauge (blue) and one common narrow gauge (red) rail spacing

Narrow gauge
Railroad track where the rails are spaced less than 1,435 mm (4 ft 8 1/2 in) apart,
Northern type

The Northern wheel arrangement

A steam locomotive with a 4-8-4 wheel arrangement, also known in North America as "Pocono", "Niagara", "Confederation", "Greenbrier", and "Potomac"
Notch 8 or run 8
The eighth notch of a locomotive throttle control, indicating full power on the standard American diesel locomotive control scheme

== O ==
Open wagon (UIC)
A form of freight hauling car for bulk goods
Out to foul
When equipment is placed ahead of the fouling point of a switch turnout

== P ==
The Pacific wheel arrangement

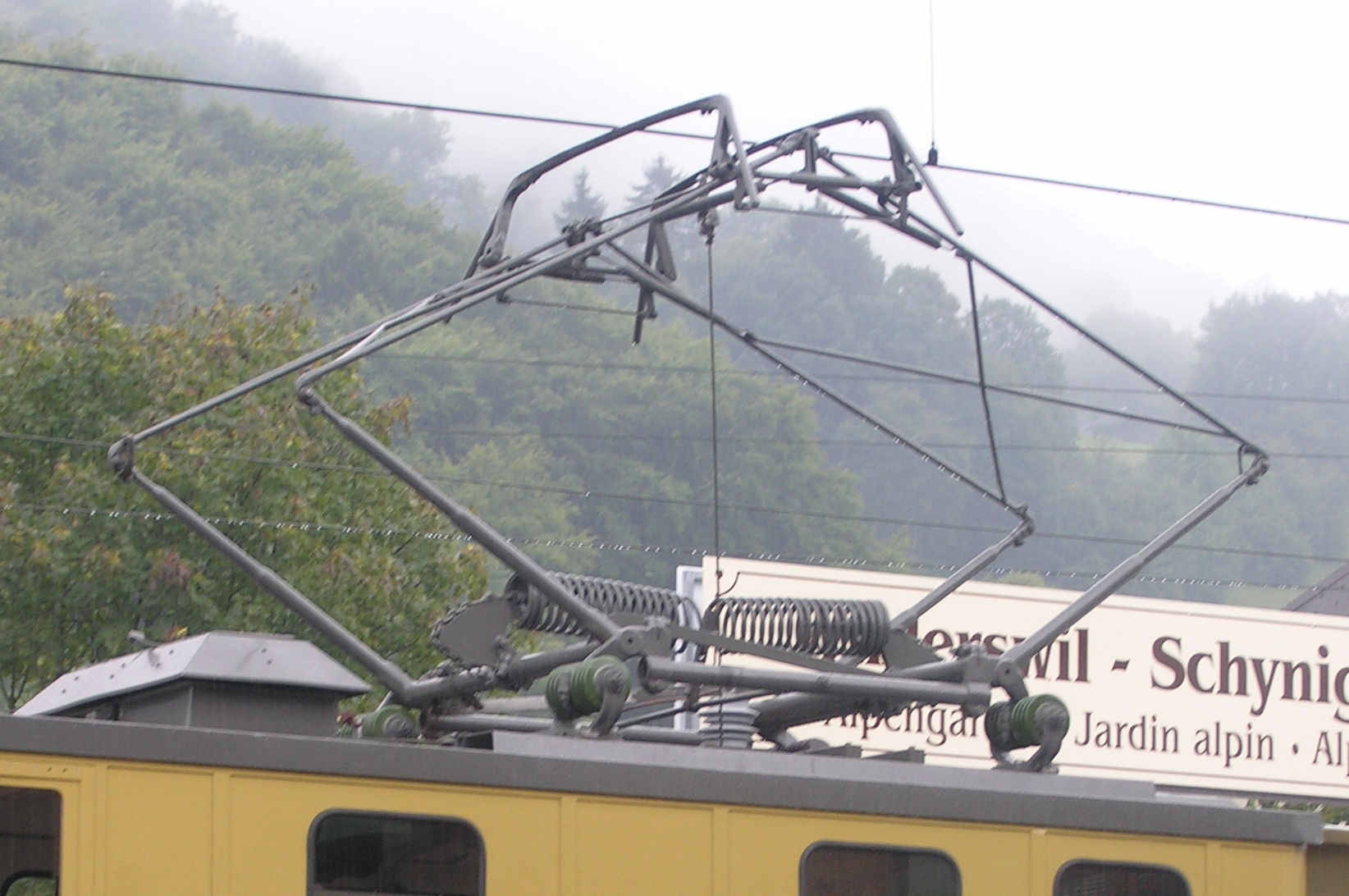
A pantograph

Pacific type
A steam locomotive with a 4-6-2 wheel arrangement
Pannier tank
A tank locomotive where the water tanks are mounted on the boiler in pannier-like fashion
Pantograph
An apparatus mounted on the roof of a rail vehicle to allow the collection of electric current from overhead lines
Paperwork
As a reason for delays, written instructions conveyed to a train's engineer in which the train must proceed slower than its normal speed. These instructions are either handed to the crew or recited and read back over radio.
Pennsy
Abbreviation for the former Pennsylvania Railroad
Per diem (pronounced by some U.S. railroaders per die-um, not per dee-um)
A fee paid by a rail company to the owner of a car (or wagon) for the time it spends on the company's property
An authorized living expense payment for some workers forced away from their home terminal
Permissive signal
A block signal whose most restrictive indication is stop and proceed. A permissive signal is identified by the presence of a number plate affixed to the mast or supporting structure. Proceeding beyond a permissive signal at stop is allowed at restricted speed if operating conditions enable a train operator to stop before reaching any train or obstruction.
Pilot
A deflective shield affixed to the front of a locomotive to protect its wheels from on-track debris; archaically called a "cowcatcher" See also: Pilot (locomotive attachment)
An employee qualified on the operating rules and physical characteristics of a certain section of the railroad, assisting a crew member who is not so qualified See also: Railroad engineer
Pilot engine
The leading locomotive during a double-heading operation
An unattached locomotive driven a specified distance in front of a special train
Pilot man
Where it is necessary to temporarily work a section of line as single track (for instance if the other track of a double-track line is out of use), a person (the pilot man) acts as the single track token.
Piston
The moving component in the cylinder of a steam engine or internal combustion engine that translates into motion the force exerted by pressurised steam or quickly-burning fuel
Piston travel
A specified distance that a brake piston may move from its cylinder to the brake rigging. If the travel exceeds or falls short of this distance, the equipment must be set out for repair.
Platform screen doors
Infrastructure used to separate the platform from train tracks.
Pony truck
A two-wheel truck or bogie at the front of a locomotive
Porch
The extended walkway at either end of a U.S. locomotive
Porter
An employee who performs or performed (the role has now largely become obsolete) various physical duties, chiefly but not exclusively involving lifting. Various types of porter include:
- A baggage porter assisting with luggage
- An operating porter assisting with safeworking duties
- A station porter assisting with general station duties
- A lad porter being a junior station porter
Portion working
The practice of coupling two or more passenger trains together over common sections of their respective routes, but otherwise operating the trains separately
Position light signal

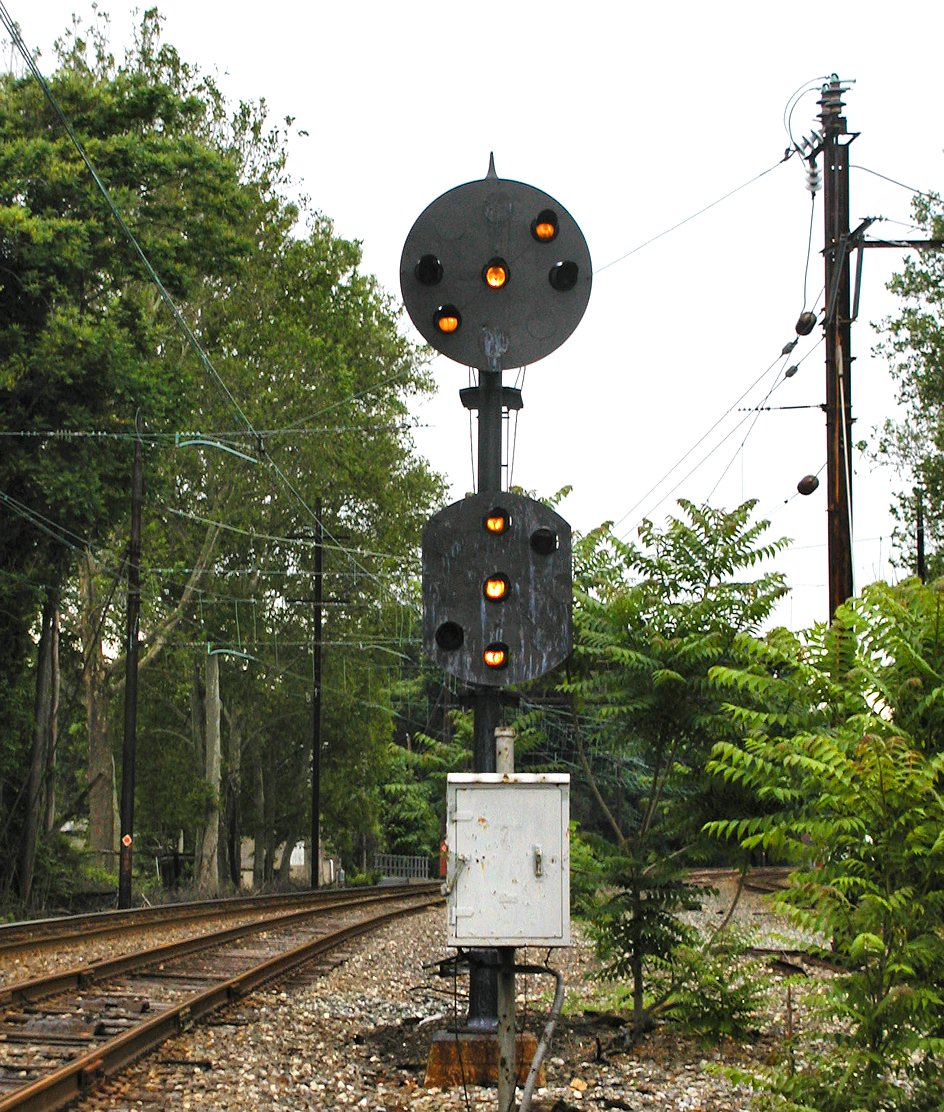
A position light signal

A block signal in which the relative position of the lights determines the meaning
Positive train control (PTC)
An American system of functional requirements for monitoring and controlling train movements with the aim of increasing operational safety
Possession
In Britain, a period of time when one or more tracks are closed for maintenance. For the duration of the work, a person in charge of possession (PICOP) has control of the line. When work is complete the possession is relinquished and control of the line handed back to the signaller.
Pound
The weight (and thus the cross section) of a length of rail. A heavier rail can carry heavier loads with less distortion and less damage to the rails themselves and the roadbed.
Power
A locomotive or group of connected (MU'd) locomotives serving as the motive power for a train
Power braking
Pulling against the train brakes at the higher end of the locomotive's power output (e.g. notches five through eight on a conventional throttle). This is considered wasteful of fuel and brake shoes, and is therefore discouraged by most operating departments.
Prairie type

The Prairie wheel arrangement

A steam locomotive with a 2-6-2 wheel arrangement
Prime mover
The internal combustion engine of a diesel locomotive
Pull apart
A rail broken from cold-related contraction
Push pole

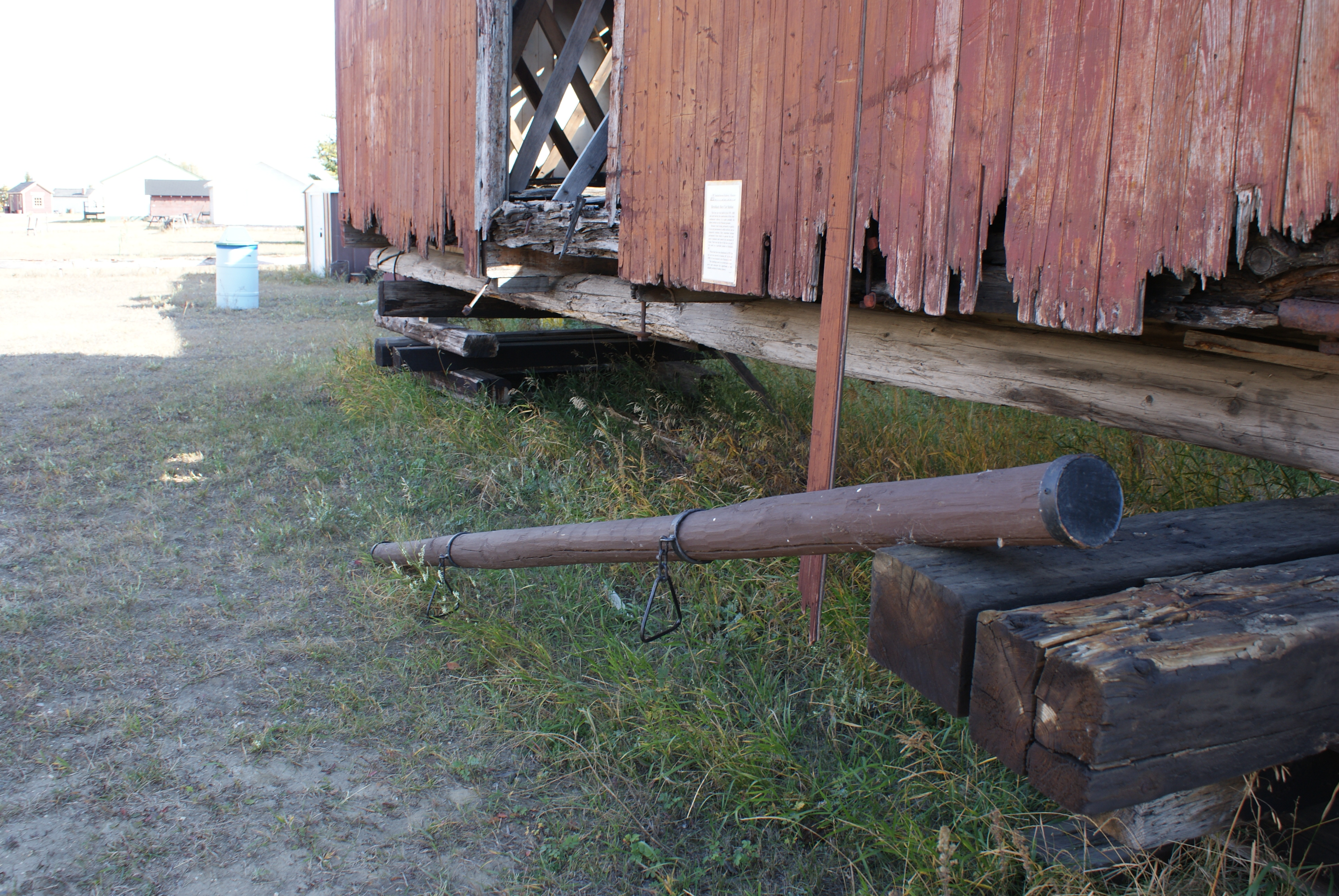
A push pole

A pole about 12 feet (366 cm) long and having a diameter of 5 inches (127 mm) and used in the United States between 1870 and the mid-1960s to push a freight car onto or off a siding or onto another track by being placed between a locomotive (on an adjacent track) and the freight car. The two ends of the poles were placed in receptacles called push pole pockets. The practice of using a push pole for switching was called "poling".
Push–pull train
A configuration for locomotive-hauled trains, allowing them to be driven from either end of the train, usually having a locomotive at one end and an unpowered control car on the other. See also: Auto train. See Top and tail for train with locomotives at both front and back.

== R ==
Rack railway, rack-and-pinion railway, or cog railway
A steep-grade railway with a toothed rack rail (usually between the running rails), used when adhesion is insufficient
Railbus
A passenger rail vehicle (typically non-articulated or rigid frame) that derived from bus propulsion and construction technology, but may evolve into larger dimensions, performance, and characteristics similar in appearance to a light DMU railcar
Railcar
A self-propelled single-unit or articulated passenger car with a driver's cab at one or both ends. In multiples, may be called a diesel multiple unit (DMU) or electric multiple unit (EMU).
Rail crossing
The opposite of a dead-end rail, i.e. a line connecting locations accessed by other railways, often associated with the overcoming of natural obstacles, such as mountain ranges. Not to be confused with a railway crossing a road (see Level crossing).
Railfan
A hobbyist or enthusiast of trains
Rail grinder
A machine used to remove irregularities in the surface of the rails that may be self-powered or part of a consist
Rail profile

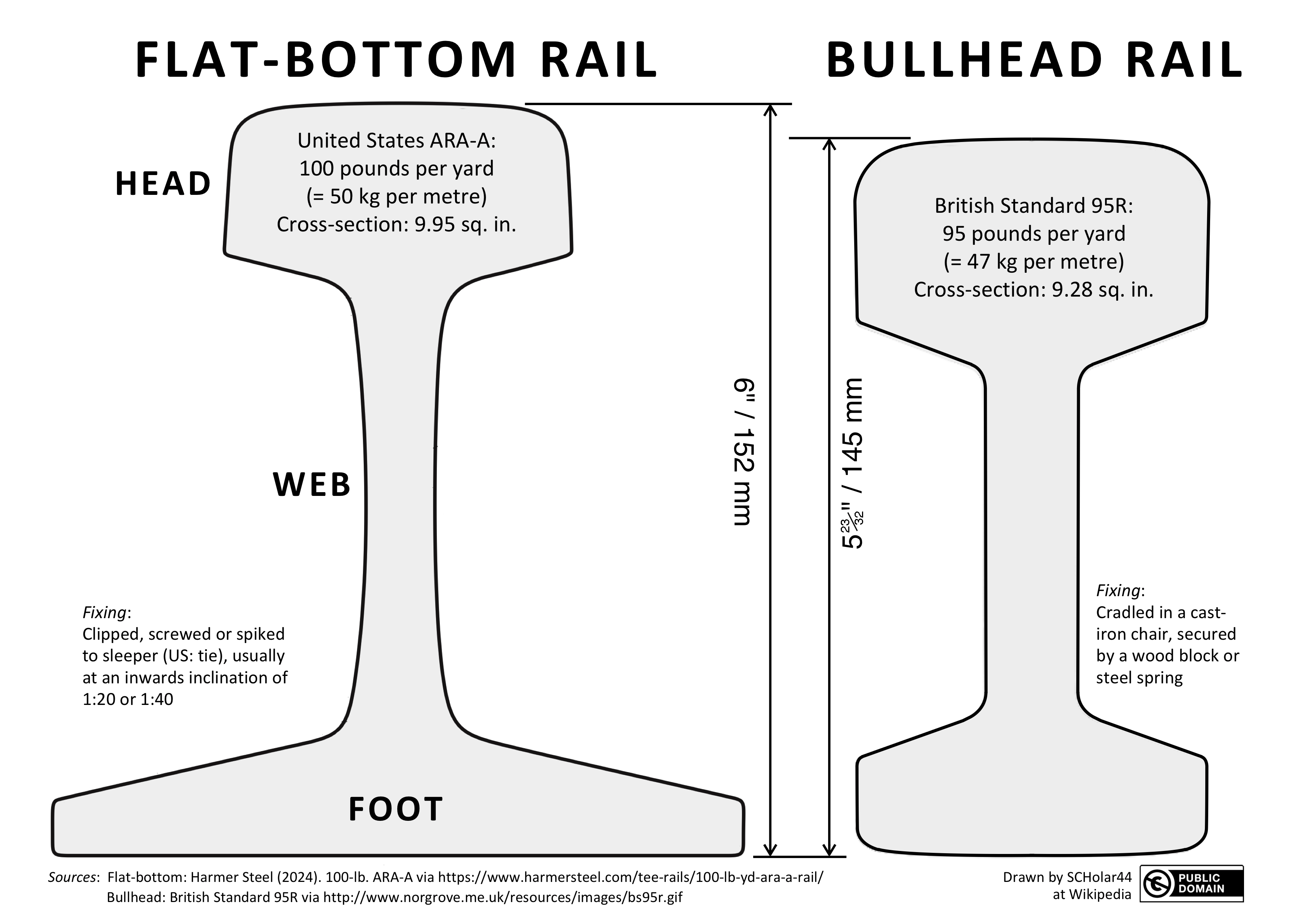
Rail profiles of flat-bottom and bullhead rails

The cross-sectional shape of a rail. There are many rail profiles, often specific to individual railroads. Rails must be periodically scanned electronically, their data inspected and analysed, then re-profiled with rail grinding machines to maintain the correct profile. Rails that cannot be restored are condemned and replaced.
Rail squeal
A screeching train–track friction sound, most commonly occurring on sharp curves or heavy braking
Rail tractor
A small petrol (gas) or diesel shunting (switcher) locomotive
Railroad car
Any railroad vehicle other than a locomotive
Railroadiana
Artifacts of railways around the world
Railway line, railroad line, rail line, or train line
A railway route connecting two or more places or other railway routes
A railway route constructed by an organization, usually one formed for that purpose
A railway route that has an official name (notably bestowed by engineers line references in the UK)
A set of railway routes that are bundled for publicity purposes (e.g. a UK train operating company)
Railway station

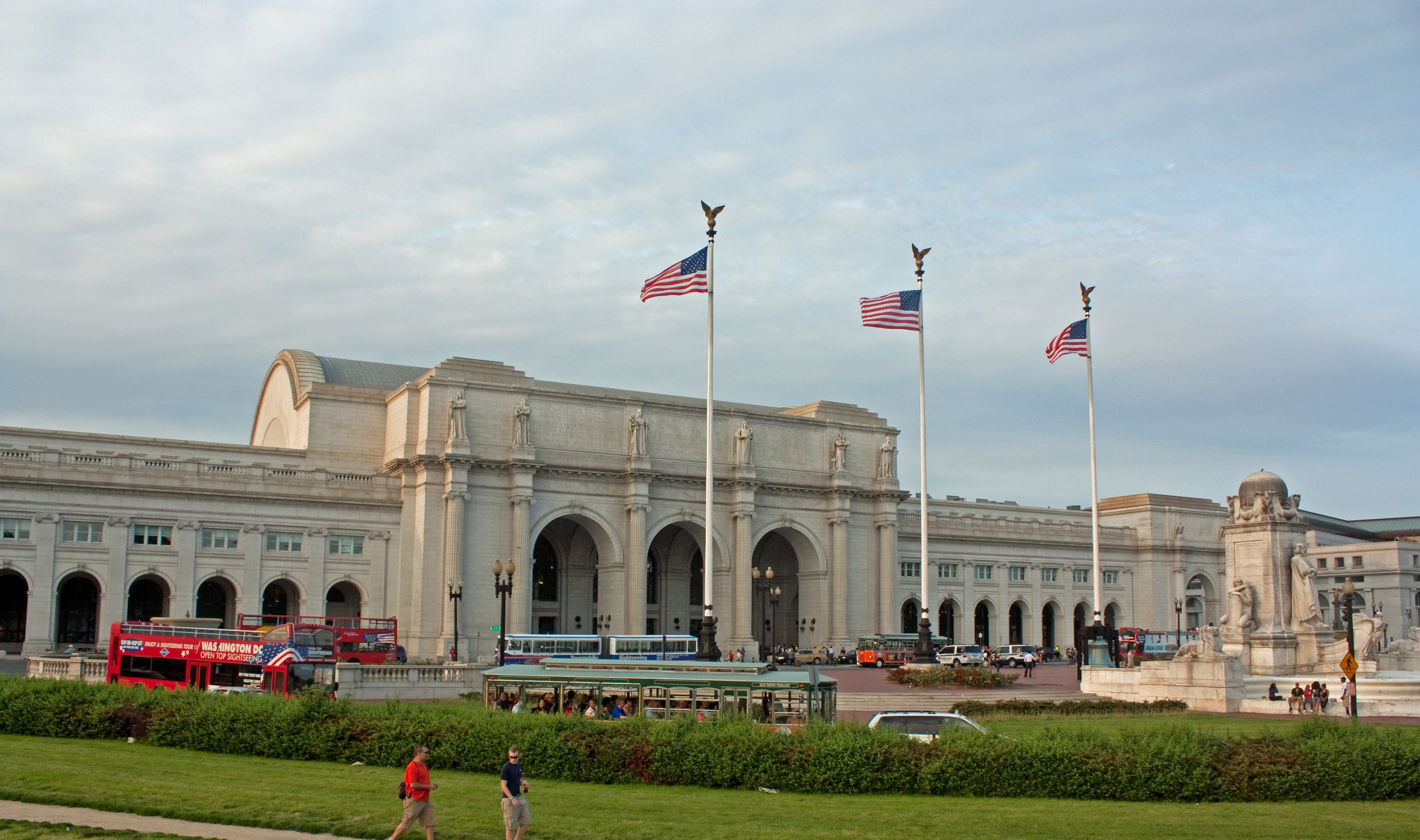
Washington Union Station in Washington, D.C., an example of a railway station

A train station, a stopping point for trains, usually with passenger access
Railway terminal
A building for passengers at the end of a railway line
Red
A colour generally associated with stop, when shown by signals or flags
Red zone
The area between, under, or within a few feet of cars and locomotives. To enter the zone, a ground employee must obtain protection from the locomotive engineer (if a locomotive is coupled) or a blue signal (if no locomotive is coupled).
Reefer
A refrigerated railcar, used to transport perishable goods
Refuge siding
A siding used as a passing place on a main line, where slow trains may be held whilst an express passes—a simpler, but less convenient, form of the passing loop
Reporting mark
A two- to four-letter code, assigned by the Association of American Railroads, that is applied to equipment operating on North American railroads to identify the owner
Rerail frog or rerailer

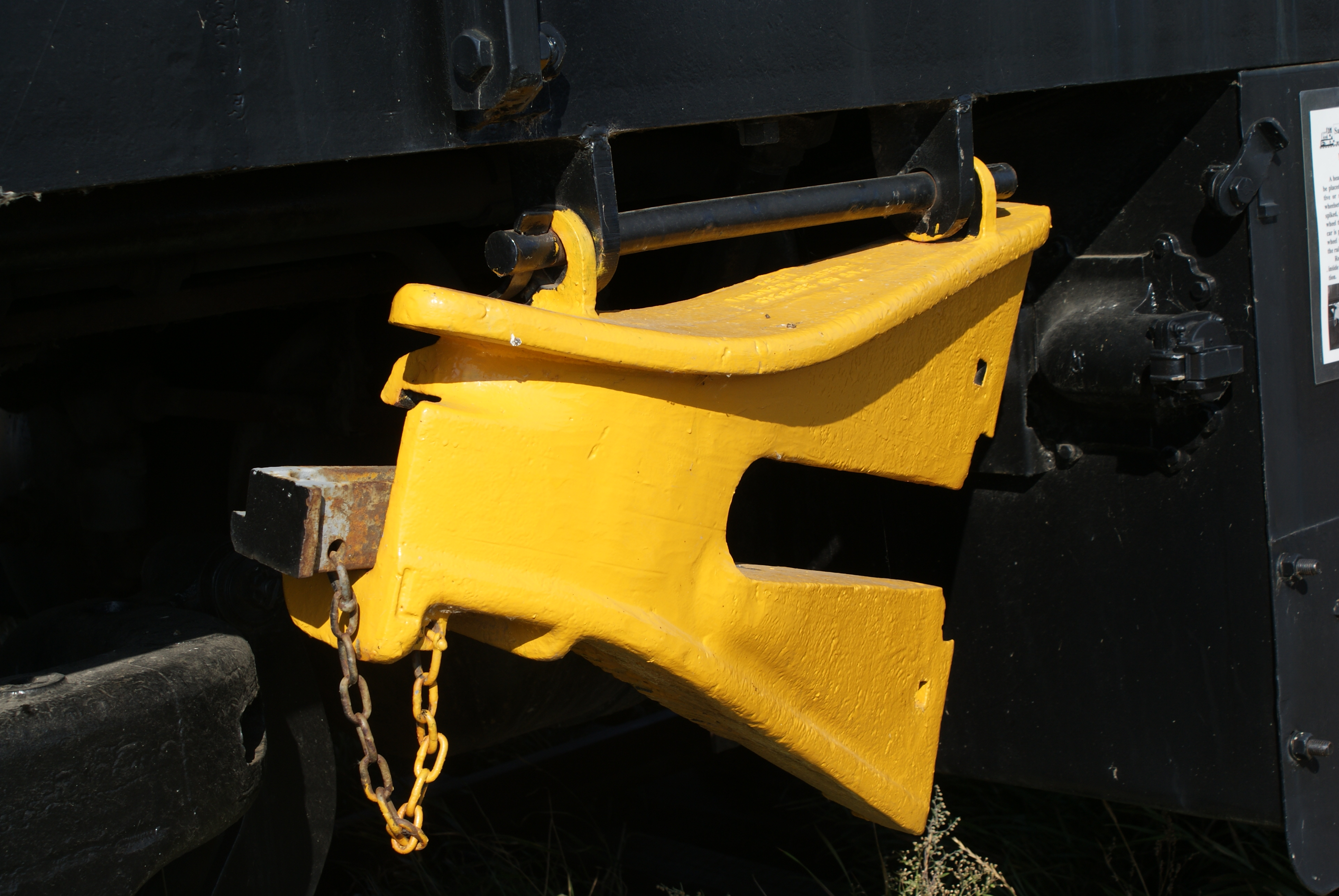
A rerail frog or rerailer stored (on its side) on a locomotive. The slot is placed over the rail and the derailed wheel is pushed or pulled until it runs up the rerailer and back on to the track.

A metal casting incorporating a slot that allows the casting to fit over the rail near the wheel of a derailed car. The locomotive then pushes or pulls the car so that the derailed wheel runs up the rerailer and back on to the track.
Retarder
A device installed in a classification yard used to reduce the speed of freight cars as they are sorted into consists
Reverser or reverser handle
The handle that controls the directional control on a locomotive. See also Cut off.
Ribbon rail
Continuously welded rail
Right-side failure
A failure in a signalling or other safety critical system that leaves the system in a safe condition
Roadrailer
A highway trailer, or semi-trailer, that is specially equipped for direct use on a railroad
Rolling stock
In UK parlance, any railway vehicle that is not capable of moving under its own power
In US parlance, any railroad car or locomotive
Rookie
See Trainee.
Rotary
Short for rotary snowplow, an extreme-duty railroad snowplow used mainly in the mountain ranges of the American West

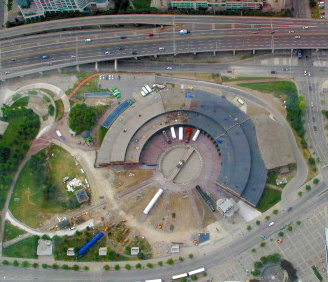
A roundhouse and turntable, viewed from above

Roundhouse

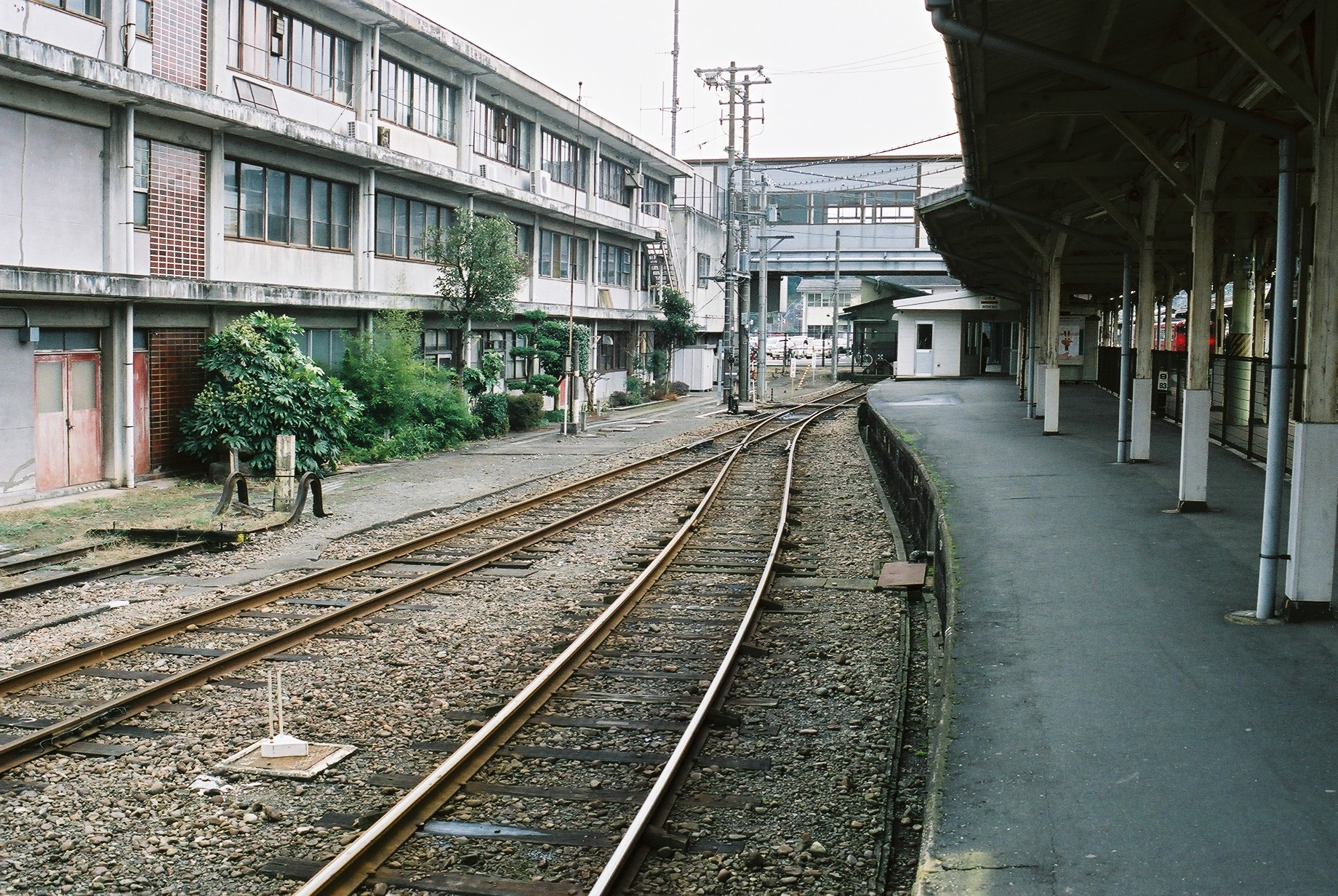
Platform track and a run-round loop at Toyooka Station, Hyogo, Japan, the terminus of the line from Miyazu

A circular or semi-circular structure used for storage and running maintenance of locomotives
Route selector panel, punch box, or train-identification pushbuttons (New York City Subway)
A box or panel adjacent to a rail line at an interlocking, with several buttons for train operators to select a desired route, which is then either communicated to a signal tower where an operator fulfills the request, or switched automatically
Ruling gradient
The longest or steepest grade on a division, thus setting the standard for track speeds, locomotive tonnage ratings, and train handling instructions
Run
The action verb for the train's movement. The train runs across the track.
Runaway
A heavy train that has lost speed control while descending a steep grade, due to either brake failure or poor preparation by the crew
Running track
An other-than-main track, typically providing access to a yard or industry and governed by the requirements of restricted speed
Run-round
The practice of detaching a locomotive from its train, driving it to the other end of the train and re-attaching it, to allow the train to proceed in the direction it has just come from (e.g. when it reaches its destination and forms a service in the other direction).
Run-through power
Locomotives that remain attached to a manifest or unit train from their home rails over the tracks of a receiving railroad until the train reaches its final destination

== S ==
Saddle tank
A tank locomotive with the water tank mounted on top of the boiler like a saddle
Safe place
An area within the network of an operator where evacuation of passengers can be performed, depending on current operational conditions, with a minimum of risk to the passengers (e.g. stations, refuges on the line)
Safeworking
In Australia, the system of rules and equipment designed to ensure the safe operation of trains
Sandbox
A container on locomotives and self-propelled multiple units, or trams, that run on tramways and adhesion railways. The container holds sand, which a crew can drop onto the rail to improve rail adhesion under wet, steep, or slippery rail conditions. The sandbox and operating mechanism are collectively known as sanding gear.
Sandite
Consists of a mixture of sand, aluminium, and a unique type of adhesive, used instead of plain sand for extreme slippery rail conditions
Santa Fe type

The Santa Fe wheel arrangement

A steam locomotive with a 2-10-2 wheel arrangement, named for the Atchison, Topeka and Santa Fe Railway—the first railroad to use such a configuration
Saturated locomotive
A steam locomotive not equipped with a superheater; the steam thus remains at the same temperature as the water in the boiler
Scale
Solid debris distilled from boiling water in a steam locomotive. To prevent corrosion damage from scale build-up, the locomotive must undergo a boiler wash once each operating month.
Schnabel car
A specialized type of freight car for extra heavy and oversized loads where the car is loaded in such a way that the load forms part of the car superstructure
Searchlight
A signal with a single light source usually capable of displaying three different colors. An internal mechanism governs the color displayed.
Section
A portion of a train that may be operated independently or combined with other sections to operate as a single unit
A portion of railway line designated for signalling or maintenance
An interior portion of a sleeping car made up of two double seats during daytime that convert to two double berths during night-time
Semaphore signal

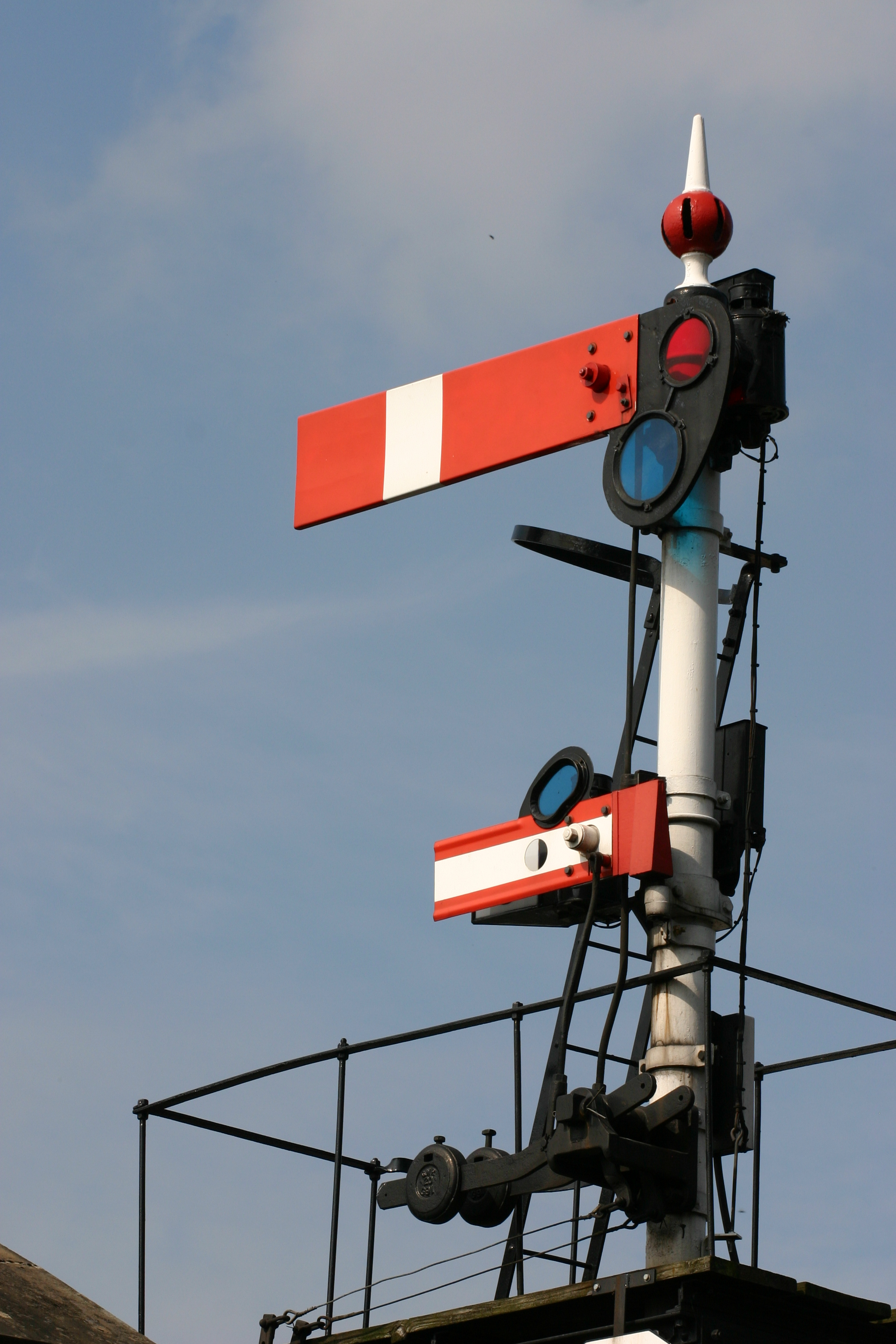
A British lower-quadrant semaphore signal with subsidiary arm below

A type of signal that has a moving arm to change the indication
Shay locomotive
A type of geared steam locomotive built to the patents of Ephraim Shay
Shunt
In UK and Australian parlance, to make up and divide trains in sidings, to move trains to or from sidings, or to move trains between platforms in a station
Shoofly
Temporary track used to avoid an obstacle that blocks movement on the normal track section
Shuttle train
A train, usually a passenger service, that runs back and forth, usually over a relatively short distance, such as between a junction station and a branch-line terminus.
Side tank
A tank locomotive with water tanks mounted each side of the boiler
Siding
A section of track off the main line. Sidings are often used for storing rolling stock or freight. A siding is also used as a form of rail access for warehouses and other businesses, where the siding often meets up with loading docks at rail car height. In the U.S. the term also covers the British term loop. Also, a passing track in the U.S.
Signal

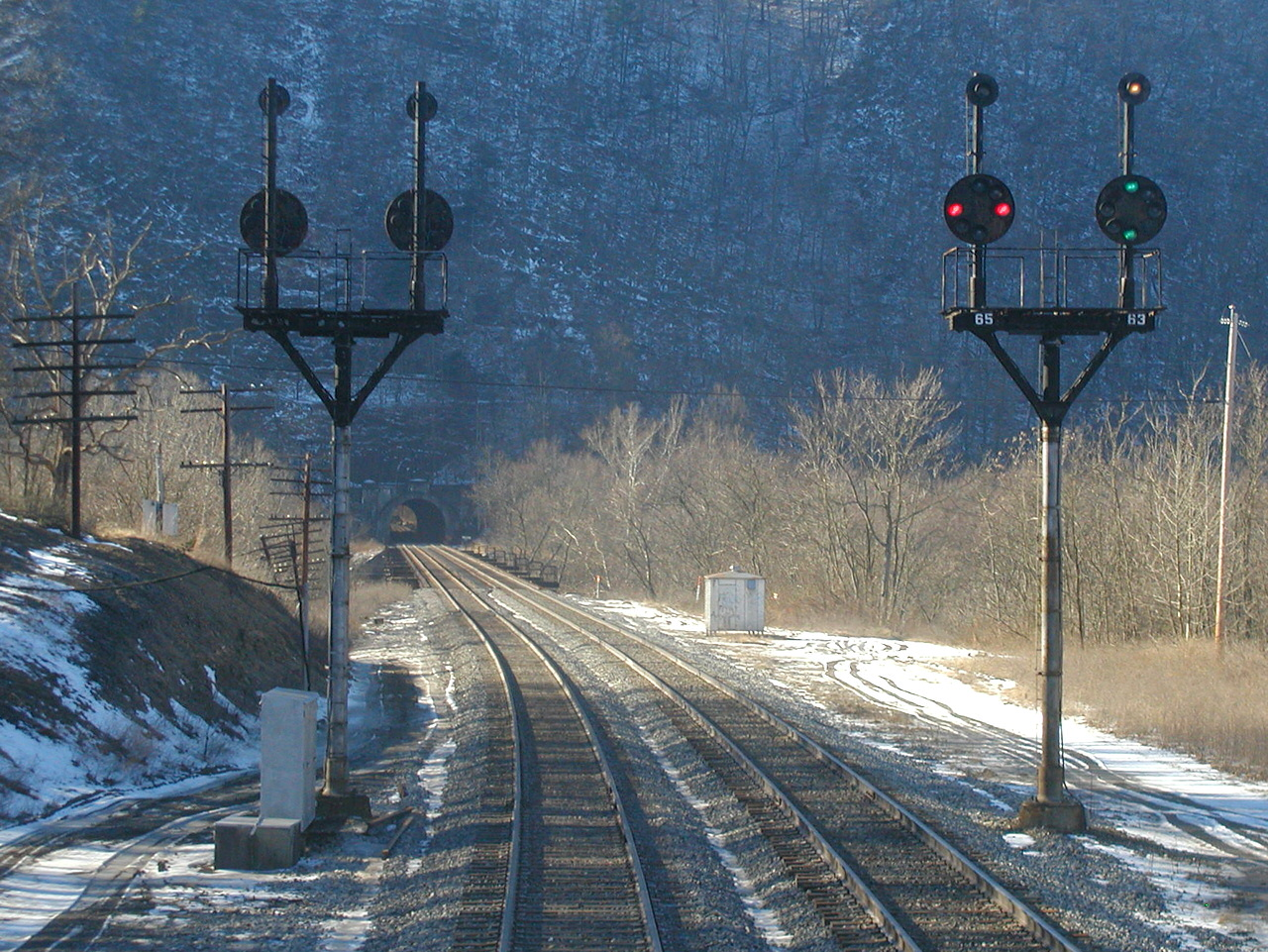
A two-head color position signal on a CSXT mainline where the left head displays "Stop" and the right, "Clear"

A device that indicates the condition of the line ahead to the driver of a train
Signal box
A building or room that houses signal levers (usually in a frame), a control panel or a VDU-based control system
Signal passed at danger
The British term for the event in which a train passes a signal to stop without authorization to do so
Signaller or signalman
A person in charge of the signalling at a station or junction, often in a signal box
Slippery rail
The condition of fallen leaves or other debris lying on and clinging to a railroad track that could cause train wheel slippage, resulting in premature wheel wear and train delays
Slow order
A local speed restriction below the track's normal speed limit often designated by yellow and green flags. Slow orders can be imposed on a temporary basis to protect, for example, maintenance of way employees while sections of track are under repair. Widely used in areas where track is substandard and in need of repair.
Slug
A locomotive that contains traction motors yet lacks the diesel engine to create its own power, which is instead supplied by a connected mother locomotive
Smokebox
An enclosed (normally cylindrical) space attached to the end of the boiler opposite the firebox on a steam locomotive (normally the front). Supports the stack; steam pipes to and from the cylinders pass through here; contains the blastpipe where the exhaust steam is used to provide draft for the fire. In superheated locomotives, also contains the superheater header and (optionally) a front-end throttle.
Snowplow, snow plow, snowplough, or snow plough

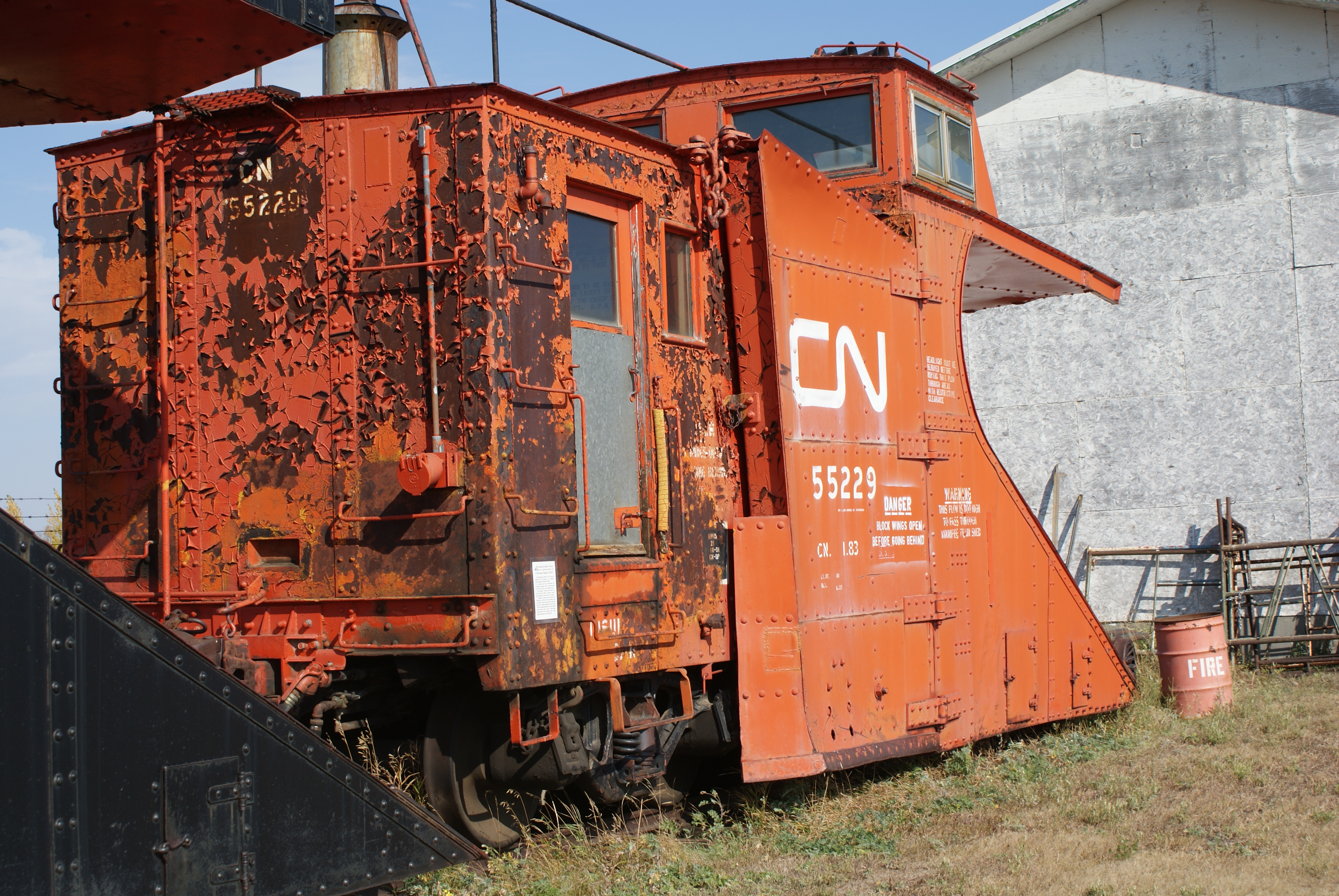
A Canadian National Railway prairie rail snowplow

A rail service vehicle used for snow removal from train tracks
Snow shed
A long shelter erected over a railroad track on the side of a mountain to protect the line from avalanches and drifting
Span bolster
The beam between two bogies
Spike

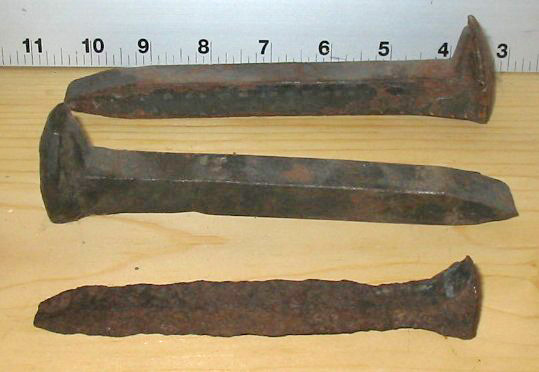
Two unused and one heavily corroded spikes, with an inch ruler shown for scale

A bolt, pin, or nail used to hold rails, or plates connected to the rails (known as tie plates), to sleepers (ties)
Spiral easement
See Track transition curve. Also known as tangent lead-in.
Spreader

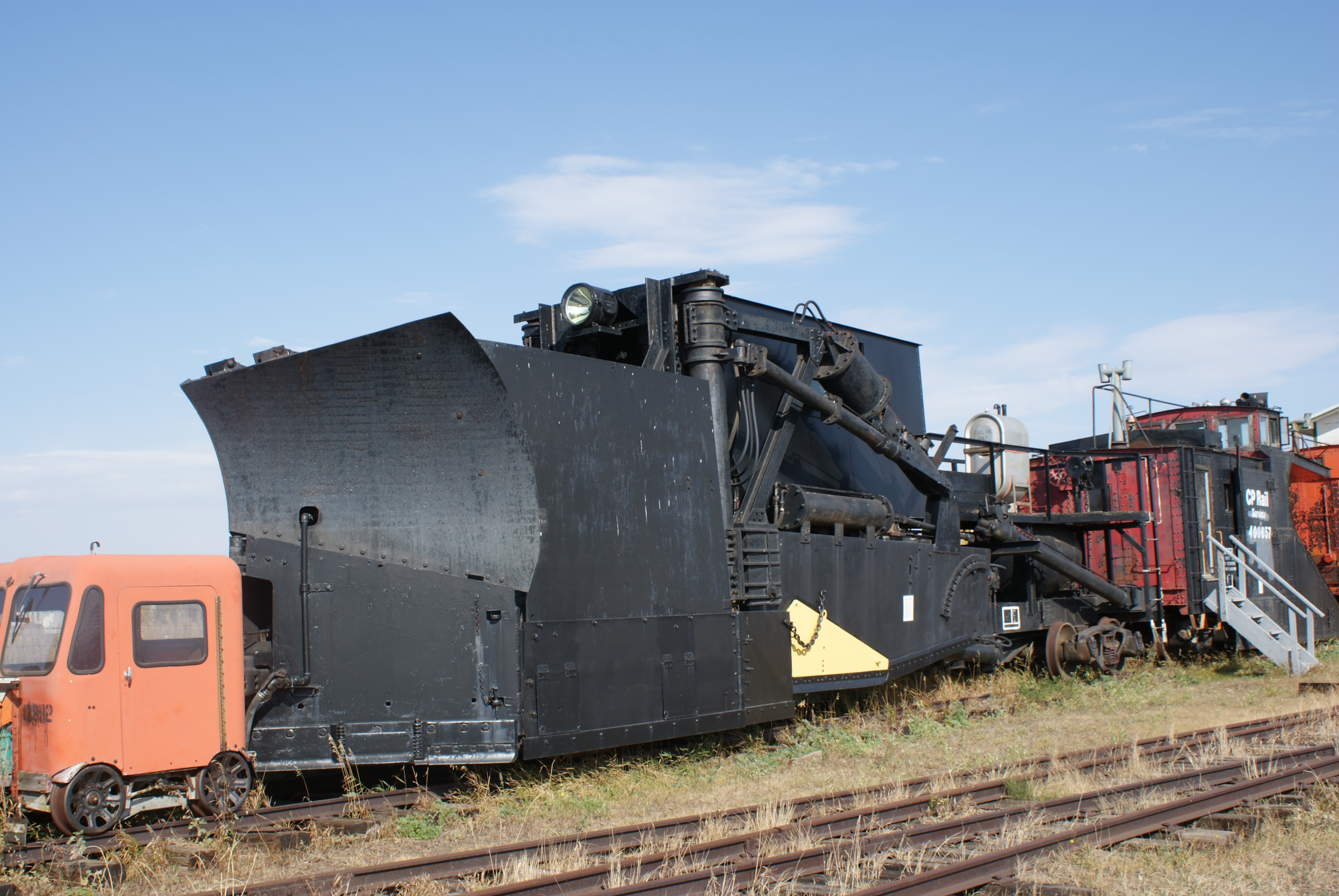
A Jordan spreader

Maintenance of way equipment designed to spread or shape ballast profiles, remove snow, clean and dig ditches as well as trim embankments
Spur line
A very short branch line may be called a spur line.
Self-propelled ultrasonic rail testing (SPURT) (India)
A self-propelled rail-defect detector car
Staff and ticket
The Australian term for a method of safeworking involving a token
Standard gauge
A gauge where the rails are spaced 1,435 mm (4 ft 8 1/2 in) apart—by far the most common gauge worldwide
Station master
The person in charge of a station
Steam generator
A device generally used in passenger trains to create steam for heating. The steam generator is usually in the locomotive but may also be located in other cars.
Steam reverser
A reversing gear worked by a steam cylinder controlled from the cab
Stop signal overrun
The American term for the event in which a train passes a signal to stop without authorization to do so
Subdivision
In North America, the trackage area within a division covered by a single timetable
Supercharger
A mechanical device that boosts the pressure of engine intake air to above atmospheric level, causing an increase in power. Not to be confused with the blower used to scavenge the cylinders of a naturally aspirated two-stroke Diesel engine.
Superelevation
Areas on curves where the outside rail is elevated higher than the inside rail, creating a banked curve, generally allowing higher speeds and more comfort for passengers (on passenger trains).
Superheater
A device in a steam locomotive that raises the temperature of saturated steam substantially beyond the boiling point of water, increasing power and efficiency
Survey
To determine the position of constructed objects, including rail infrastructure, in relation to the earth's surface. This is accomplished by measuring angles and distances based on the principles of triangulation.
Surveyor
A person assigned to perform survey work
Switchback or zig zag
A method of climbing and descending steep gradients, where shallow-gradient track reverses direction for a while, and then reverses again to continue in the original direction
Switchman
A railroad worker responsible for assembling trains and switching railroad cars in a yard

== T ==
Tamping machine

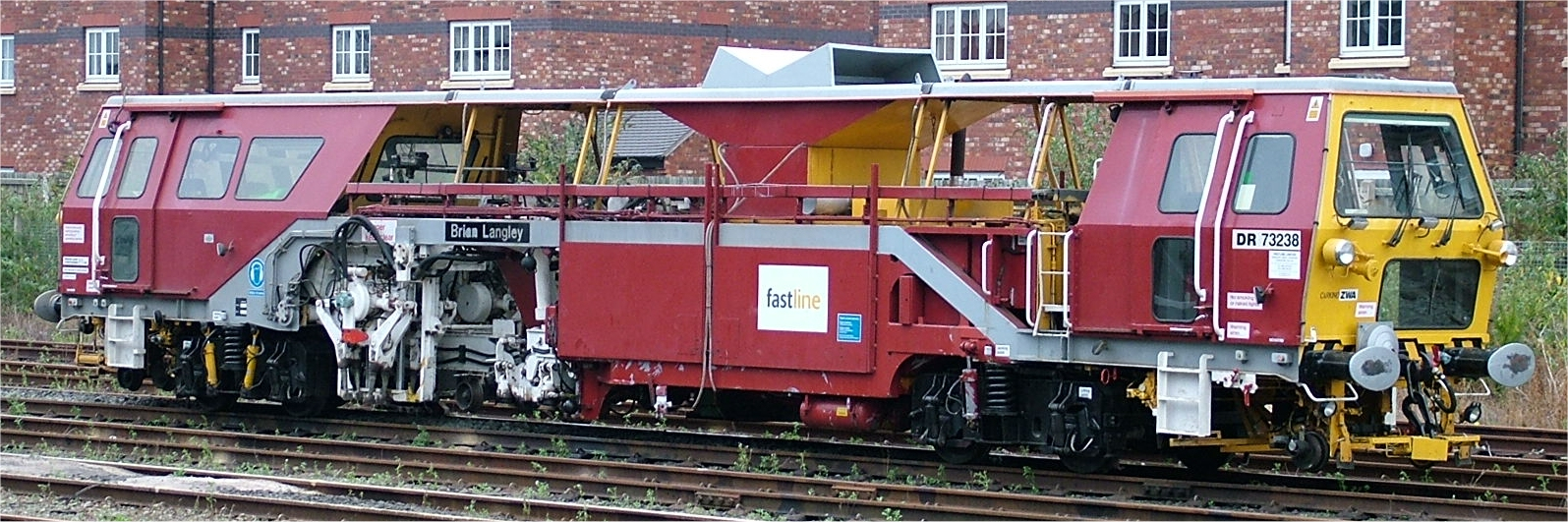
A track tamping machine

Generally, a locomotive used in track maintenance and equipped with track lifting facilities, and paddles that push ballast beneath a rail track to assure its level and cant
Tank car
A type of rolling stock designed to transport liquid and gaseous commodities
Tank locomotive or Tank engine
A steam locomotive that carries its water in one or more on-board water tanks rather than in a separate tender.
Team track
In North America, A spur or siding for loading freight, often used by firms not having their own direct rail access
Tender
A specialized rail car attached to a steam locomotive to carry its fuel and water supplies, sometimes along with tools and flagging equipment
Terminal railroad (or terminal railway)
A company in the United States that owns no cars of its own and transports only the railroad cars of other companies around a specific terminal station
Texas type

The Texas wheel arrangement

A steam locomotive with a 2-10-4 wheel arrangement
Third rail
An electrified rail that runs along the tracks, giving power to trains. Used mostly in subways and rapid transit systems.
Through coach
A passenger coach that is disconnected from one train and attached to another before continuing on with its journey, thus avoiding the need for passengers themselves to switch trains
Through platform
The standard platform and track arrangement at a station. The train pulls alongside the platform, arriving from one end of the station, and may pass out the other end of the station by continuing along the same track
Tie plate
A plate bolted to sleepers to hold the rails in place
Trailer on flat car (TOFC)
Intermodal freight transport
Token
A physical object given to a locomotive driver to authorize use of a particular stretch of single track
Track bed or trackbed
The foundation of rail tracks
Track bulletin
In North America, a form used by railroad employees that shows the locations of slow orders, maintenance of way work locations, and other conditions affecting the track and movement of trains
Track circuit
An electrical circuit that detects the presence of locomotives or cars (as their wheelsets electrically bond the rails) in a block of track, and provides real-time input to signaling logic
Track transition curve
The gradual application of superelevation and tighter curve radius, calculated with reference to the anticipated line speed and the final curve radius, on the approach to a bend. Also known as the transition spiral and spiral easement.
Track Warrant Control
Control of train movements by "track warrants" which are sets of instructions issued to a train crew authorizing specific train movements.
Trackside objects
See Wayobjects.
Traction current pylon
Traction motor
A large electric motor that powers the driving wheels of an electric or diesel–electric locomotive
Tractive effort
The pulling or pushing force exerted by a locomotive or other vehicle
Trailing
A turnout where both legs merge in the direction of travel—the opposite of facing
Train bell
In North American practice, the warning bell on a locomotive or any autonomous railway vehicle
Train coupler
The mechanical interface that links vehicles so a driver can operate them together. The coupler can be a purely mechanical device such as a screw coupler or bar coupler. Alternatively the coupler can also incorporate electrical or pneumatic connections.
Train horn
The warning horn in a locomotive or in a control car
Trainman
In North America, an employee assigned to train service, such as a conductor, brakeman, or switchman
Train inauguration
The automated process of train bus configuration that includes detecting all bus nodes and their orientation, assigning the numbers to particular bus nodes and collecting their properties.
Train operation and management
In Europe, the procedures and related equipment enabling a coherent operation of the different structural subsystem, both during normal and degraded operation, including in particular train driving, traffic planning and management
Trainmaster, terminal manager, or road manager
In North America, an employee who supervises operations over a given territory
Train order
The process whereby signallers or dispatchers can change the order or timing of trains to maximise overall train service performance in real time
Train set
A toy train with its tracks, buildings, etc.
Trainset
A group of rolling stock that is permanently or semi-permanently coupled together to form a unified set of equipment. Trainsets are most often used in passenger train configurations.
Tram
A city-based rail system that typically shares its operational space with other vehicles and often runs on, across, or down the center of city streets
Tram-train
Trams that are designed to run both on the tracks of a city-based rail system and on the existing railway networks. Tram-trains' dual-voltage capability makes it possible to operate at lower speeds on city streets and at over 60 miles per hour (97 km/h) on main line tracks allowing travel in an extended geographical area without changing the method of transport.
Treadle

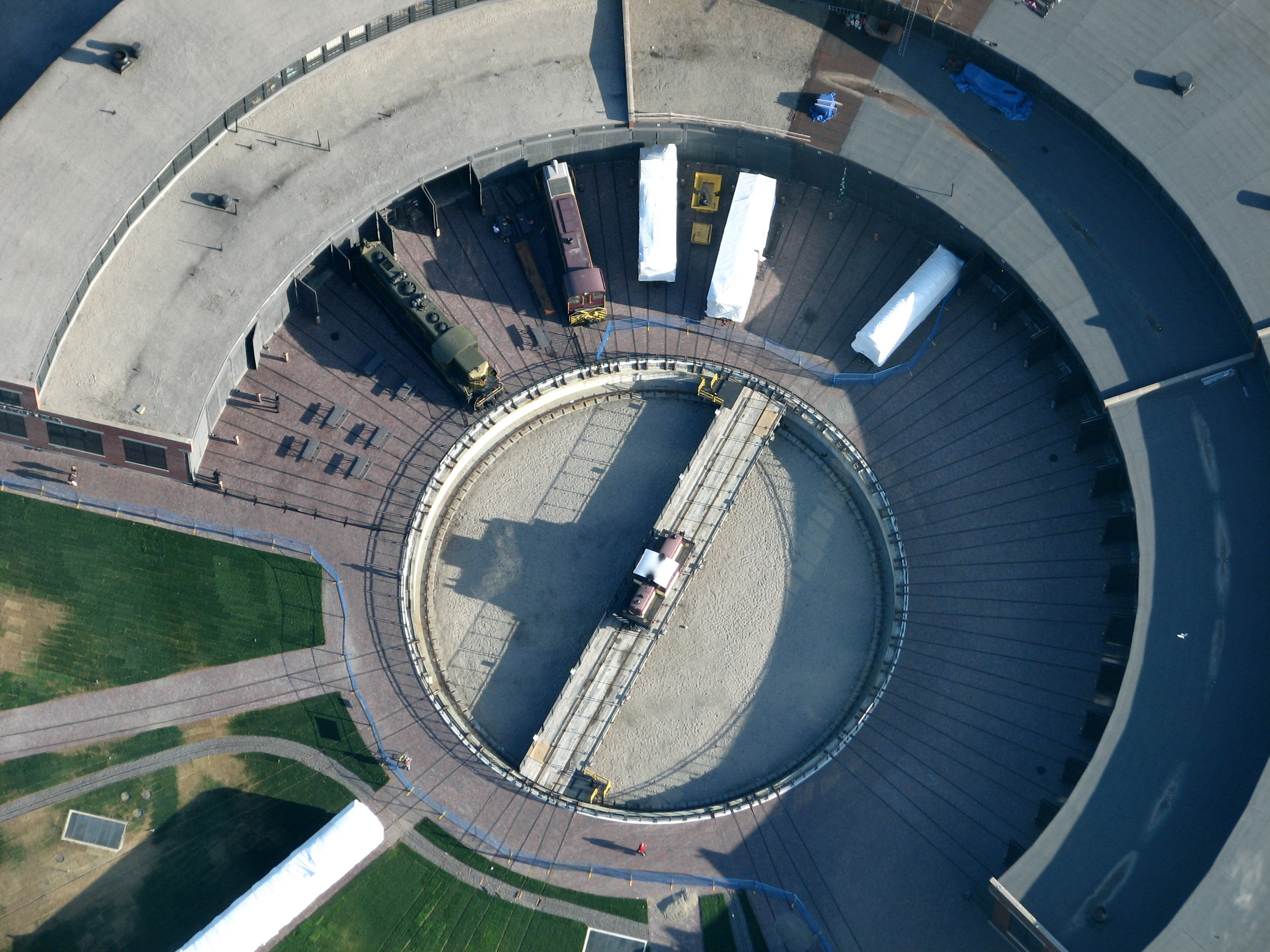
A turntable in Toronto, Canada

A mechanical or electrical device for detecting the presence of a rail vehicle with pin-point accuracy, unlike a track circuit, which provides detection over an arbitrary distances
Turnout or points
A switch
Turntable
A section of track that rotates to let locomotives and rolling stock turn around or access several engine maintenance sidings in a small area

== U ==
Unit train
A train in which all cars (wagons) carry the same commodity and are shipped from the same origin to the same destination, without being split up or stored en route
Underbridge
In the parlance of rail transport in the United Kingdom, an 'underbridge' is a bridge that allows a roadway to cross under the course of a railway line, in contrast to an overbridge, or overpass, that crosses over the railway.
Underframe

A framework of wood or metal carrying the main body structure of a railway vehicle, such as a locomotive, carriage or wagon.

== V ==
Vactrain
A proposed design for very-high-speed rail transportation.
Vacuum brake
A continuous train brake that is fail-safe in operation. It is powered by a vacuum from the locomotive but the application is actually by atmospheric pressure when the vacuum is released. Primarily used historically in Britain and in countries influenced by British practice. Now largely superseded by the air brake.
Valve gear
The linkage mechanism that operates the valve for a driving cylinder, to alternately admit steam to the cylinder and then exhaust it when the piston's stroke is nearly complete

== W ==
Wagon top boiler

A boiler having the steam dome over the firebox and a sloping course from in front of the firebox to the cylindrical shell.
Waist (of boiler)

That part of the boiler shell immediately in front of the firebox.
Waist brace

A vertical steel plate riveted to the waist sheet crosstie and to an angle piece which is also fastened to the waist of a boiler to secure that part to the frame, and at the same time allow a small amount of expansion and contraction.
Waist brace angle
A steel strip riveted to the shell of a boiler and having its edge bent to a right angle, and to which a plate or strut is fastened for the purpose of bracing the waist of a boiler to the frames.
Waist sheet
The plate forming that portion of a boiler directly ahead of the outside firebox sheet. It is sometimes made cylindrical in shape and sometimes tapering or conical.
Waist sheet crosstie
A transverse brace or casting binding the frames together in front of the firebox and usually having a plate fastened to it and to the boiler to support the waist of the boiler at this point.
Waist sheet wearing plate
A steel strip riveted to the waist sheet of a boiler and to the angle of the waist sheet brace or expansion plate, to reinforce the bearing or support of the boiler at this point.
Walschaerts valve gear

A valve gear socalled from its inventor, largely in use in Europe and being rapidly introduced in the United States. It has no eccentric and is entirely outside of the frames.
Washer
A plate of metal or other material, usually annular, which is placed under a nut or bolt head to give it a better bearing. Two or more washers are sometimes combined and called washer plates, strap washers, double or twin washers, triple washers, etc. They are sometimes made beveled or triangular for a rod or bolt, which is oblique, with reference to the bearing surface. A socket washer or Hush washer is one provided with a recess for the bolt head, so as to leave it Hush with the adjoining parts. Cut or wrought washers are those stamped out of rolled iron plates. Cast washers are made from cast iron. Both kinds are used.
Wash-out plug
A short, solid metal cylinder with a screw thread cut on the outside and a square or hexagonal head for convenience in applying a wrench, screwed into the water leg and above the crown sheet of a locomotive boiler. Wash-out plugs are usually located near the bottom of a water leg, a little above the mud ring, or above the crown sheet, and from four to eight are provided in order to allow mud to be thoroughly washed out.
Waste
The spoiled bobbins of cotton or woolen mills, used for wiping machinery and for Journal Packing, which sec.
Waste cock or waste valve
An arrangement attached to and forming part of the body of an injector, consisting of a valve provided with a handle or lever. If this valve is left open when the steam and water supply valves to the injector are also open, steam passes back through the injector feetf pipe and may thus be used to prevent the water in the tender tank from freezing.
Water
A liquid composed of two gases, hydrogen and oxygen in the proportion of 8 to 1 by weight, colorless and transparent in the pure state. It is never obtained pure for locomotive use, always holding in solution a quantity of solid matter such as sulphates and carbonates of lime and magnesia that may form objectionable quantities of scale in a boiler. See Steam. Boilers fed with water that forms much scale must be washed out at frequent intervals; in some districts even at the completion of every trip. The best practice at present is to install water-treating plants at water stations, by means of which the scale forming matters in the water are chemically treated and removed before the water reaches the locomotives.
Water brake
An arrangement, consisting of a set of pipes and valves connected to a locomotive boiler below the water line, for admitting water to the cylinders to retard the motion of the pistons and thus act as a brake on the locomotive, which is run with the reverse lever back of the center. It is used on lines having long, steep grades.
Water brake valve
A globe valve with its connecting pipe screwed in the boiler back head below the water line, for operating the water brake.
Water cooler
A tank or vessel for carrying drinking water which is usually cooled with ice. The sides are generally made double, and the space between Tilled with some non-conducting substance. When used on locomotives they are commonly located on the tender tank.
Water column (railroad) or standpipe
A device used for delivering a large volume of water into the tank or tender of a steam locomotive.
Water gauge or water glass

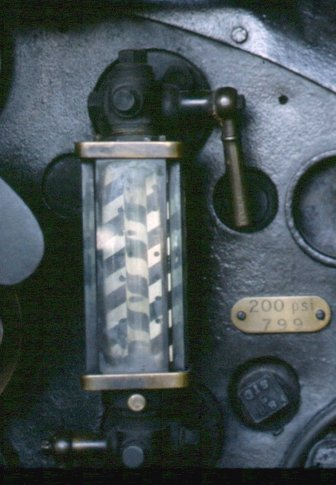
A water gauge

A device to enable an engineman or fireman to observe the height of water in a locomotive boiler. It consists of two brass fittings screwed into the back head, one above the other, and connected by a stout glass tube which communicates, through the fittings, with the water and steam in the boiler. The water level showing in the glass tube must be the same as that inside the boiler.
Water gage casing
A covering or protector around a water gage glass. The casing prevents the glass from flying about in case of breakage.
Water gage cock
One of two brass fittings screwed into a locomotive boiler head, having a valve or plug cock for opening or closing communication between the boiler and the water gage glass. The end of the glass tube rests in an opening in the gage cock and is held in place by a coupling nut which is screwed down on an elastic washer surrounding the tube.
Water gage cock extension
A piece of pipe leading from an opening in a boiler to one of the water gage cocks.
Water gage cock gland
A neck or extension formed on a water gage cock to receive the end of the glass tube, or the stem of the cock or plug.
Water gage nut
A hexagonal brass nut surrounding a water gage glass near the end and holding an elastic washer so as to prevent leakage of water or steam around it.
Water grate
See Grate and Water Pull Bar Grate.
Water leg
The space between the inner and outer sheets of a firebox. At the bottom, where the two sheets are riveted to the mud ring, the width of the water leg is from three to five inches, increasing more or less rapidly, according to the design and size of the firebox.
Water pull bar grate

A grate designed for burning anthracite coal, consisting of tubes running longitudinally through the bottom of the firebox and communicating with the front and back water legs, usually screwed into the tube sheet and expanded into the back sheet, a copper ferrule being used to insure a tight joint. Between the water tubes, iron pull bars, enclosed in short tubes, pass completely through the back water leg and project a snort distance outside the back head. These outer ends have slots in them, into which a rod can be put, and the bars pulled out for the purpose of dumping or cleaning the fire. Midway of the length of tfye firebox is a bearer or bridge that supports both the tubes and bars that form the grate. A similar bearer is placed at the front end of the box to hold the bars.
Water scoop
A device for putting water in a locomotive tender, while it is in motion, from a trough laid between the rails, and sometimes called a track tank. It consists of a cast-iron or steel plate conduit of rectangular cross section, about 8 x 12 inhes, passing up through the tender tank and turned over at the top so as to discharge the water downward. The lower end, underneath the tender frame, is fitted with a scoop or dipper that can be lowered into the trough by a lever worked by hand, or by compressed air applied in a cylinder whose piston rod is connected to the mechanism for raising and lowering the scoop. Owing to its inertia, the water is forced up through the siphon pipe into the tender tank when the scoop moves through the trough at a speed of from 25 to 40 miles per hour.
Water scoop air cylinder
A small cast-iron cylinder fastened underneath a tender for operating the water scoop. Compressed air is conveyed to it from the main air reservoir through a valve, thus moving the piston. The piston rod is connected to the levers that lower the dipper into the water trough between the rails. To insure the rapid raising of the dipper, when the locomotive reaches the end of the track tank, a coil spring is fastened to the scoop mechanism.
Water scoop air cylinder piston
A metal disk fitted inside a water scoop air cylinder and having attached to it a rod connected to the operating mechanism of the scoop.
Water scoop arm
A bent lever or bell crank, to one end of which the air cylinder piston rod is attached, while to the other the links for raising and lowering the dipper are bolted.
Water scoop body
That portion of a water scoop shaped like the frustum of a pyramid that is lowered into the track trough and to the lower end of which the dipper or nozzle is attached. It is usually made of cast iron.
Water scoop cylinder connecting rod
A short rod attached to the end of the piston rod of a water scoop cylinder, and with a coil spring attached to the end. This spring raises the scoop out of the water when the end of the track tank is reached and holds it in that position.
Water scoop cylinder piston rod
A wrought-iron or cast-steel rod attached to the piston of the air cylinder at one end, and to the bell crank for operating the water scoop at the other.
Water scoop cylinder support
A metal carrier secured underneath a tender frame for the purpose of holding the water scoop air cylinder, which is bolted to it.
Water scoop delivery pipe
The square pipe which joins the scoop with the siphon pipe in the tender tank.
Water scoop delivery pipe brace
A rod secured to the tender frame center sills to stiffen the delivery pipe.
Water scoop delivery pipe bracket
A cast-iron support riveted on to the end of the delivery pipe and having a hole or bearing in its outer end for one of the trunnions of the water scoop.
Water Scoop dipper
A hinged extension or hood at the end of a water scoop. That portion of the scoop that goes into the water.
Water Scoop dipper adjusting bracket
A support or holder fastened underneath a tender to limit the movement of the dipper arm and thus prevent the scoop from hanging too low and striking the ties or ballast.
Water scoop dipper lifting link
A short metal bar attached to the bell crank or arm of the scoop-lifting mechanism and to the dipper, for raising it out of the water.
Water scoop end support
A metal rod fastened to either side of the outer end of a water scoop, next to the dipper, a.nd to the under side of the tender frame.
Water scoop hanger
The bracket or frame fastened underneath a tender frame to support a water scoop and the mechanism for raising and lowering it.
Water scoop lifter
One of two links or bars attached to a water scoop at one end and to the water scoop arm at the other.
Water scoop locking cylinder
A small air cylinder whose function is to hold the water scoop in place and prevent it from dropping down on the track.
Water scoop neck
The upper end of a water scoop; that portion that joins the water scoop pipe directly under the tender tank.
Water scoop operating lever
The arm or lever by which the water scoop is raised or lowered by hand. It extends up through the tender deck alongside the tank leg.
Water scoop operating lever connecting rod
A long piece of pipe or solid rod, attached to the water scoop operating lever at one end and the scoop lifting arm at the other.
Water scoop operating lever fulcrum
A cast iron support fastened on a tender frame and holding a bolt or pin that passes through the water scoop operating lever.
Water scoop pipe
The cast iron or steel plate conduit passing up through a tender for conveying the water forced into the scoop to the top of the tank.
Water scoop pneumatic valve
The valve for admitting compressed air to a water scoop cylinder.
Water scoop rod
The rod connecting the water scoop lever with the arm or bell crank.
Water scoop shaft
A pivot fastened at right angles to a water scoop arm and resting in bearings in supports or hangers attached to the tender frame by bolts or rivets.
Water scoop shaft bracket
A carrier attached to a tender frame and holding the ends of the water scoop shaft.
Water scoop side brace
A rod fastened on either side of a water scoop and to the side sill of a tender to give transverse stiffness to the scoop.
Water scoop spring
The spring used to assist in lowering or raising a water scoop.
Water scoop spring rod
A shaft attached to a water scoop operating mechanism and to the coil spring which forms a part of it.
Water space
That part of a locomotive boiler that is filled with water, in contrast with the part normally occupied by steam. A Water Leg, which see, is also called a water space.
Water table
A device for improving the combustion of fuel in a locomotive firebox. The form invented by William Buchanan, of the N. Y. C. & H. R. R. R., consists of two flat, parallel plates, extending diagonally upward from the tube sheet to the back sheet of the firebox. These plates are about 4 Ms inches apart, are strengthened with staybolts in the same manner as are the inner and outer firebox sheets, and form an inclined water leg connecting the front and back legs of the firebox. A hole 18 or 20 inches in diameter is made through the center of the water table for the passage of the products of combustion to the upper part of the firebox on their way to the tubes. Not extensively used.
Water tube
A pipe containing water and surrounded with hot gases in contrast to a lire tube surrounded by water and having hot gases passing through it. See below.
Water tube boiler
A boiler in which water circulates through tubes surrounded by hot gases, the products of combustion in the firebox. Not extensively used for locomotives although tried on the London & South Western.
Watt
An electrical unit expressing the rate at which energy is transformed, or work done. It is used to express the product of the voltage of an electric circuit and the current or amperage. As it is a very small unit, a multiple of it, 1,000 times as large, and called a kilowatt, is commonly used. One kilowatt is about 1.34 horsepower.
Way car
An alternate term for a caboose used by the Chicago, Burlington and Quincy Railroad, Chicago and North Western Railway, and Atchison, Topeka and Santa Fe Railway.
Wayobjects or wayside objects
Trackside objects or any structures at the wayside or beside the rail tracks usually within the right-of-way, such as railway signals, third rails, overhead lines and their supports, traction current pylons, utility poles, electrification systems, platforms, or boom barriers at level crossings.
Wedge
1. A term in quite general use for a Journal Bearing Key, which see.
2. A Pedestal Wedge, which see, is a tapering liner for the jaws of a pedestal to adjust the position of the driving box and take up wear.
Wedge bolt
A bolt passing through the pedestal cap of a driving or trailing wheel for adjusting the pedestal wedge.
Weigh shaft (British)
See Reverse Shaft.
Weigh shaft balance weight (British)
A large mass of cast iron used on British locomotives in place of a reverse shaft spring.
Weigh Shaft lever (British)
See Reverse shaft arm.
Well tank
A type of tank locomotive. The water tank is mounted between the frame plates, beneath the cab and boiler.
Well wagon (UIC)
A flat wagon with a depressed centre used for carrying extra tall loads.
Westinghouse Air Brake.
A system of continuous brakes invented and patented (the first patent in 1869) by Mr. George Westinghouse, which is operated by compressed air. The air is compressed, by a steam air pump on the locomotive or an electric motor compressor on the car. and is stored up in a tank called the main reservoir on the engine or tender. By the original form of brake the compressed air was conveyed from the tank by pipes connected together between the cars by flexible brake hose to brake cylinders under each car. by means of which the pressure of the air was communicated to the brake levers, and thence to the brake shoes. A later and improved form is the Westinghouse automatic air brake, commonly called simply Westinghouse brake, which is now in universal use. At the present time the Westinghouse brake, unless otherwise specified, is always understood to mean the automatic air brake. The change made from the original form of the Westinghouse air brake in order to make it automatic was to carry a full pressure of air at all times in the brake pipes and cause the brakes to be applied by a reduction of this pressure instead of by the admission of pressure, so that the breaking apart of the train or a reduction of pressure by escape of air at any point on the brake pipe would apply the brakes to the whole train at once. A further advantage was that the action of the brakes was made quicker by saving the appreciable interval of time required for the compressed air to flow from a single reservoir at one end of the train in sufficient quantities to fill all the brake cylinders. An auxiliary reservoir is placed under each car, containing air at the same pressure as in the brake pipes. An ingenious valve called the triple valve connects the brake pipe, auxiliary reservoir and brake cylinder together in such manner that any reduction of pressure in the brake pipe opens a passage for the air from the auxiliary reservoir to the brake cylinder, applying the brakes, and closes the connection between brake pipe and reservoir. To release the brakes, the pressure in the brake pipes is restored, when the triple valve closes the connection between the auxiliary reservoir and brake cylinder and opens one between the brake cylinder and the outer air and between the auxiliary reservoir and the brake pipe. In order that the train brakes may be applied from any car, each car is fitted with a valve called the conductor's valve, connected to the brake pipe so that the compressed air therein can be permitted to escape by opening the valve.
Westinghouse E-T locomotive brake equipment (air brake)
A new arrangement of air brake apparatus as applied to a locomotive. It differs from previous locomotive brake schedules principally in that the details are centralized and simplified so as to reduce the total number required, occupy less space, and give the engineman a mere certain and flexible control of the locomotive brakes. It has all the good features of any of the older equipment, besides a number of new ones, viz., uniform brake cylinder pressure on engine and tender, and a pressure-maintaining feature by which the brake-cylinder pressure is automatically held to that resulting from the brake application as long as such application lasts. See Distributing Valve.
Westinghouse friction draft gear
A form of draft gear in which the forces are absorbed and dissipated by friction. The friction device is encased in a malleable iron cylinder open at the front end. The front follower bears against a preliminary spring, the other end of which bears against the center wedge of the shape of the frustum of an octagonal pyramid. Surrounding the wedge are four pairs of segmental carriers having one rib each which lies in a groove in the cylinder. The other grooves in the cylinder are filled by friction strips resting on the carriers. These strips are of wrought iron and have lugs formed on them which engage in corresponding cavities in the carriers so that the friction strips must move with the carriers. The function of the preliminary spring is to absorb the light shocks without bringing into action the friction parts. The main release spring, placed back of the carriers, forces the carriers to their normal position when the pressure is removed and also adds to the capacity of the device. When the follower plates are moved toward each other, the preliminary spring is compressed until its capacity of 20,000 pounds is exceeded, when the follower bears against the release pin and forces it forward, relieving the wedge from the pressure of the auxiliary release spring, thereby allowing the compression of the preliminary and auxiliary preliminary springs to force the wedge forward and press the segmental carriers and friction strips firmly into the cylinder grooves. The follower then strikes and forces the segmental carriers in, producing friction between the friction strips and the grooves. The complete movement gives a resistance of 100,000 pounds. In releasing, the preliminary spring is gradually restored, and the auxiliary release spring then forces the wedge out, while the release spring returns the friction strips and carriers, giving a complete release. Owing to the varying width of the slots and lugs on the friction strips and carriers the strips are released four at a time through successive small distances. The operations of buffing and pulling are exactly the same, except that the load comes on the front or rear follower first, as the case may be. See Draft Gear.
Westinghouse SWA-SWB locomotive brake equipment
See Combined automatic and Straight-air locomotive brake.
Westinghouse traction brake
The adaptation of the Westinghouse air brake equipments to electrically propelled cars or trains. The changed conditions of motive power and method of operating such cars or trains have necessitated various changes in the details of the equipments, while the general principles of the Westinghouse straight-air and automatic brakes, which are the foundation of all known air brake equipments, remains the same. A motor-driven air compressor furnishes the compressed air; an electric pump governor controls the operation of the same; the brake and triple valves are of different design to accord with the conditions for which they are required. Otherwise the description of the Westinghouse Air Brake, which see, covers the traction brake also.
Westinghouse train air signal apparatus.

A device for utilizing the supply of compressed air required for operating the Westinghouse brakes to transmit signals to the engine or motorman's cab instead of using the ordinary bell cord.
Westinghouse unit switch system of control

A system of control for railway and other motors by means of low potential train line circuits taken from a storage battery under the car which operate electro-magnets controlling pneumatic valves and cylinders operating the main controller circuits under each car by air taken from the brake pipe. The main controller under each car consists of a group of electro-pneumatic switches which give the desired combinations to the motor circuits. A reverse switch and auxiliary resistance are essential parts of the apparatus'under each car. The apparatus is applicable for cither direct current or alternating current motors. Also called Westinghouse electro-pneumatic system of control.
Wheel
The rolling component typically pressed onto an axle and mounted on a rail car or locomotive truck or bogie. Wheels are cast or forged (wrought) and are heat treated to have a specific hardness. New wheels are trued to a specific profile before being pressed onto an axle. All wheel profiles must be periodically monitored to insure proper wheel to rail interface. Improperly trued wheels increase rolling resistance, reduce energy efficiency and may create unsafe operation. A railroad wheel typically consists of two main parts: the wheel itself, and the tire around the outside. A railway tire is itself steel, and is typically heated and pressed onto the wheel, where it remains firmly as it shrinks and cools.
Wheel
1. A circular frame or solid piece of wood or metal which revolves on an axis.
A circular frame or disk, revolving on an axle, serving to support a moving vehicle. Engine truck wheels are sometimes made of chilled cast iron, but more commonly have a cast iron or cast steel center with a steel tire fastened on, as are also tender truck wheels. See Wheel Center.' Driving wheels and trailing wheels are always made with a spoke center of cast iron or cast steel with a steel tire shrunk on. In addition to shrinkage, driving wheel tires are held on by bolts through the rim and by retaining rings also held by bolts.. {{{content}}}
Wheels
(Specification for Cast Iron, A. R. M. M. Recommended Practice). At the convention of 1888 the following specifications and tests for castiron wheels were adopted as standard. In 1801 these were changed to Recommendations. The specifications and tests are as follows: 1. The cliills in which the wheels of any one wheelmakcr are cast shall be of equal diameters, and the same chill must not vary at different points more than one-sixteenth of an inch in diameter. 2. There shall not be a variation of more than one-half inch in the circumference of any given number of wheels of the same nominal diameter, furnished by any one maker, and the same wheel must not vary more than one-sixteenth of an inch in diameter. The body of the wheel must be smooth and free from slag or blow holes. The tread must be free from deep and irregular wrinkles, slag, chill cracks and sweat or beads in the throat which are one-eighth of an inch or over in diameter, or which occur in clusters of more than six inches in length. 3. The wheels broken must show clean, gray iron in the plates; the depth of pure white iron must not exceed seven-eighths of an inch or be less than three-eighths of an inch in the middle of the tread, and shall not be less than three-sixteenths of an inch in the throat. The depth of the white iron shall not vary more than one-fourth of an inch around the tread on the rail line in the same wheel. 4. Wheels shall not vary from the specified weight more than two per cent. 5. The flange shall not vary in the same wheel more than three thirty-seconds of an inch from its mean thickness. 6. The single plate part of a 33-inch wheel, known as the Washburn pattern, shall not be less than five-eighths of an inch in thickness in a wheel weighing from 550 to 575 pounds, and not less than three-fourths of an inch in thickness in a wheel weighing from 575 to 600 pounds.
Wheel base
The horizontal distance between centers of the first and last axles of a locomotive or tender. It is usual, in stating locomotive dimensions, to give the rigid wheel base, the truck wheel base and the total wheel base.
Wheel bore
The hole through the hub or central part of a wheel in which an axle is fitted. Also called axle seat.
Wheel boss (British)
American term hub. The center of the wheel, which is bored out to receive the axle.
Wheel center
The portion of a wheel inside of the tire and between it and the hub or boss. The centers of engine and tender truck wheels are sometimes in one piece and sometimes made up of two parts, the hub or boss, and the # central filling piece. Face plates, front and back, are also used. The term is seldom applied to chilled, cast or rolled steel wheels. Driving and trailing wheel centers are made of cast iron or cast steel. In Great Britain, wheel centers are frequently made of wrought iron.
Wheel climb

The process of a wheel climbing up and often off the inside or gauge side of the rail. It is a major source of derailments. Wheel climb is more likely to occur in curves with wheels whose flanges are worn or have improper angles.
Wheel cover
A strip of thin steel plate, curved to a radius slightly greater than that of a wheel, to prevent mud and oil being spattered over the locomotive. Wheel covers are usually bolted to the engine truck frame for the truck wheels, and the under side of the running board for the driving wheels. British, splasher.
Wheel cover block
A small piece of metal fastened to a running board or engine truck frame for the attachment of a wheel cover.
Wheel cover bracket
A small cast iron post or holder, for the attachment of a wheel cover.
Wheel cover edge
A heading or molding formed on the outer edge of a wheel cover.
Wheel fit
That part of a driving or truck wheel that is forced on an axle or crank pin.
Wheel flange

The inner section of a wheel that rides between the two rails. The angle between the wheel tread and flange is often specific to the rail to prevent wheel climb and possible derailments. The wheel flange is part of the wheel tire.
Wheel flange
The projecting edge or rim on the periphery of a car wheel for keeping it on the rail.
Wheel hub

The center of a wheel surrounding the axle on which it is mounted. British, boss.
Wheel hub liner
A brass or bronze disk secured to the inside hub of a wheel to form a wearing surface between the hub and the outside face of the box. Such liners are used on engine truck wheels, driving and trailing wheels.
Wheel key
A piece of steel slightly tapered, driven into a slot or keyway cut longitudinally in the wheel seat of a driving axle and a corresponding slot in the bore through a driving wheel hub to key or secure the wheel to the axle.
Wheel plates
That part of a cast iron engine truck or tender truck wheel which connects the rim and the hub. It occupies the place and fulfils the same purpose as the spokes in an open or spoke wheel. On steel-tired wheels the plates connecting the tire and hub, and bolted or fastened to each, are called wheel plates. Distinguished as front and back face plates.
Wheel press (hydraulic)
A hydraulic press for forcing locomotive driving wheels on and off their axles. They are fitted with a pressure gage which is usually graduated for total tons pressure and for pounds per square inch on the rams. They are made with capacities up to 400 tons pressure.
Wheel–rail interface
The on-contact interaction between wheels and rails. The term is used in connection with the design and management of their interaction.
Wheel ribs (cast iron wheels)
More commonly, brackets. Projections cast usually on the inner side of plate car wheels to strengthen them. They are placed in a radial position and are often curved so as to permit the wheel to contract when it cools.
Wheel rim filling piece
A flat steel strip inserted in one of the radial spaces left to allow for shrinkage in casting in the rim of a driving wheel center.
Wheel seat
That portion of an axle that is forced into a driving wheel or truck wheel.
Wheel slip
The loss of traction due to a slippery rail or wheel. Wheel slip was common with steam engines as they started to move due to the excessive torque often generated at low speed. Steam engines carried sand dispensing gear to increase traction at the start of motion.
Wheeltapper

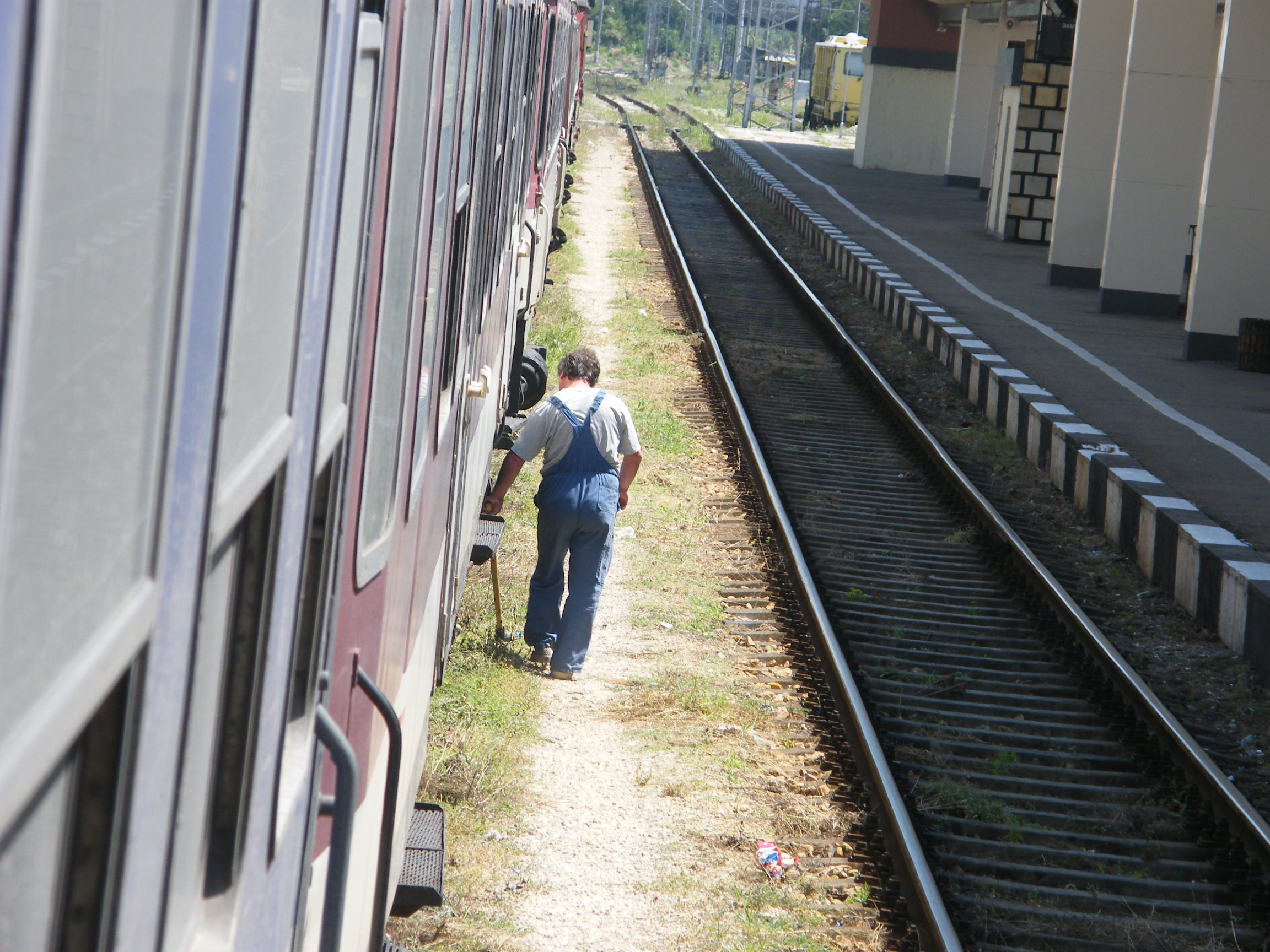
A wheeltapper at work on the Bulgarian railway

An historical railway occupation; people employed to tap train wheels with hammers and listen to the sound made to determine the integrity of the wheel; cracked wheels, like cracked bells, do not sound the same as their intact counterparts. The job was associated with the steam age, but they still operate in some eastern European countries. Modern planned maintenance procedures have mostly obviated the need for the wheel-tapper.
Wheel tread

The slightly conical section (often with a 1 in 20 slope) of a railroad wheel that is the primary contact point with the rail.
Wheel tread
The exterior cylindrical surface of a wheel which bears on the rails. The usual width of wheel tread is about 4 inches, measured from outside of wheel tread to the throat or inside of flange. The standard width from outside of wheel tread to inside face of flange, i. e.. including the entire thickness of flange, is 5!£ inches. For driving wheels the width varies from to 7 inches.
Wheel web
That portion of a cast iron truck wheel center between the huh and the rim.
Whistle
Train whistles are used as a safety warning and also by the engineer to communicate to other railroad workers. See train whistle for a description of the whistle code used to communicate. Also a nickname for an air horn on a diesel locomotive. Steam engine whistles were historically known as chimes in the US during the 19th century.
Whistle bell
A cylindrical brass chamber with flat or hemispherical top, for producing a sound by steam blown against the edge. It is screwed on a stem directly over the whistle bowl.
Whistle bowl
A hemispherical brass cup with a cylindrical extension below it containing a valve for admitting steam. The bowl has a disk over it that docs not come quite to the edge, thus leaving an annular opening through which the steam escapes, and in the center of which the steam passing up through the bell is secured.
Whistle crank
A short metal arm attached to the whistle lever in the cab for imparting motion to the lever or bar that opens the whistle valve.
Whistle crank fulcrum
A cast-iron bracket fastened in the cab of a locomotive to form a bearing for the whistle shaft.
Whistle extension
The cylindrical pipe below the bowl of a whistle, containing the whistle valve.
Whistle lever
An arm or bar in the cab of a locomotive for operating the whistle valve. It is attached to a crank that moves the lever on the whistle through the medium of a link or bar.
Whistle lever fulcrum
A small bracket attached to a whistle extension to hold the pin on which the whistle lever is pivoted.
Whistle lever rod
A link or bar connecting the whistle lever on the whistle with the operating lever in the cab.
Whistle nut
A square or hexagonal brass nut screwed on the upper end of a whistle stem to secure the whistle bell in place, and usually surmounted by an acorn-shaped top called the whistle ornament.
Whistle post

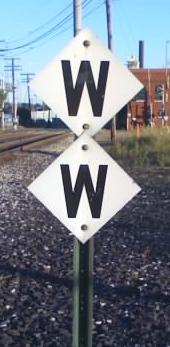
A double whistle post

An advance warning to the engineer of an upcoming grade crossing. It is the point at which the engineer should begin sounding the whistle or horn.
Whistle reservoir (train air signal)
A small steel reservoir sometimes installed for storing air to be used by an air whistle on electric locomotives.
Whistle shaft
A short metal rod in the cab, supported by a hanger or fulcrum at each end, and having the whistle lever and whistle crank attached to it.
Whistle stem
A steel or malleable iron standard, screwed in the center of a whistle bowl, and supporting the whistle bell. The bell has a hole through the top, tapped with a thread to fit that cut on the upper end of the whistle stem, which allows the height of the bell above the bowl to be adjusted.
Whistle valve
A disk with a shank or stem attached, fitting in an opening in the whistle extension for admitting steam to the whistle to cause it to sound. It is operated by a set of levers in the cab.
Whyte notation
A system of describing steam locomotive wheel arrangements (e.g. 4-6-4, 2-10-2). The first number indicates the number of "pilot" wheels that help lead the engine into turns. The second is the number of coupled wheels ("drivers"). Third are the trailing idler wheels, usually to provide support to larger fireboxes. Articulated locomotives are similarly described. For example, a Union Pacific "Big Boy" would be described as a 4-8-8-4, wherein the pilot has four wheels, followed by two sets of drivers, eight wheels per set, and a four-wheel trailing bogie under the firebox. The numbers include the wheels on both sides of the engine, so a 2-8-2 engine would have one idler, four drivers, and a final idler on each side of the engine.
Wide firebox boiler
A boiler with a wide, shallow firebox resting on the frames and extending out beyond them at the sides. The Wootten Firebox, which see, is a wide firebox for burning anthracite coal.
Wigwag
A largely superseded Level or grade crossing warning signal that consists of a swinging disc facing road traffic, with a red light in the centre. The disc normally hangs straight down, but an approaching train sets it swinging from side to side, the red light illuminates or flashes, and a bell rings.
Window
"An opening in the wall of a building or cab for the admission of light and of air when necessary. This opening has a frame on the sides, in winch are set movable sashes containing panes of glass." – Webster. Hence the window itself, especially in compound words, is often termed simply the sash.>
Window glass
Panes of glass used for windows. They are either plate or rolled glass, made by pouring the molten glass onto a table having the height of the desired thickness of the plate, and then passing a roller over the top; or blown, or common window glass, the latter being by far the cheapest and most widely used, but of very much inferior quality. It is made by blowing the glass into a largo bulb, which is then slit open while still hot and flattened out.
Window sill
A horizontal piece of wood or metal under a window, on which the cab sashes rest when down.
Working water, foaming, or priming
The condition of a steam locomotive drawing water through its throttle valve, cylinders, and smokestack, often causing damage to the cylinders or running gear.
Wootten firebox
A locomotive firebox, very wide and shallow and having a curved crown sheet of large radius, used for anthracite coal burning locomotives which require a large grate area.
Worn flat (car wheels)
Irregular wear under fair usage, due to unequal hardness of the tread of the wheel, and to be carefully distinguished from slid flat, which is a defect produced by the slipping of the wheels from excessive brake pressure.
Wrecking chain
A heavy steel chain, carried on a locomotive for use in emergencies.
Wrecking frog
See #Rerail frog or rerailer.
Wrench
1. A contrivance for screwing and unscrewing a nut.
2. A socket wrench is one having a cavity to receive a square or hexagonal end. The wrenches for the Westinghouse brake are packing nut and cap screw wrenches, and the discharge valve seat wrench.
3. A spanner is a wrench for use on round or many sided nuts, like hose couplings, to which lugs or slots are added for engaging with the wrench.
4. An alligator wrench for use on pipe or other cylindrical surfaces has immovable jaws, one serrated and the other smooth, inclined to each other at an acute angle.
5. A monkey wrench has smooth, parallel jaws, one of which is fastened to the handle or stem, while the other can be moved up to or away from it by a sleeve nut working on a thread cut on the stem.
Wrist pin
Sec Crosshead Wrist Pin.
Wrong-side failure
A failure in a signaling system that leaves the system in a dangerous condition.
Wrought iron wheel
A steel tired wheel, with a wrought iron center, either with spokes or with solid plates.
Wye (rail)
A wye (like the 'Y' glyph) or triangular junction is a triangular joining arrangement of three rail lines with a railroad switch (set of points) at each corner connecting to each incoming line.

== Y ==
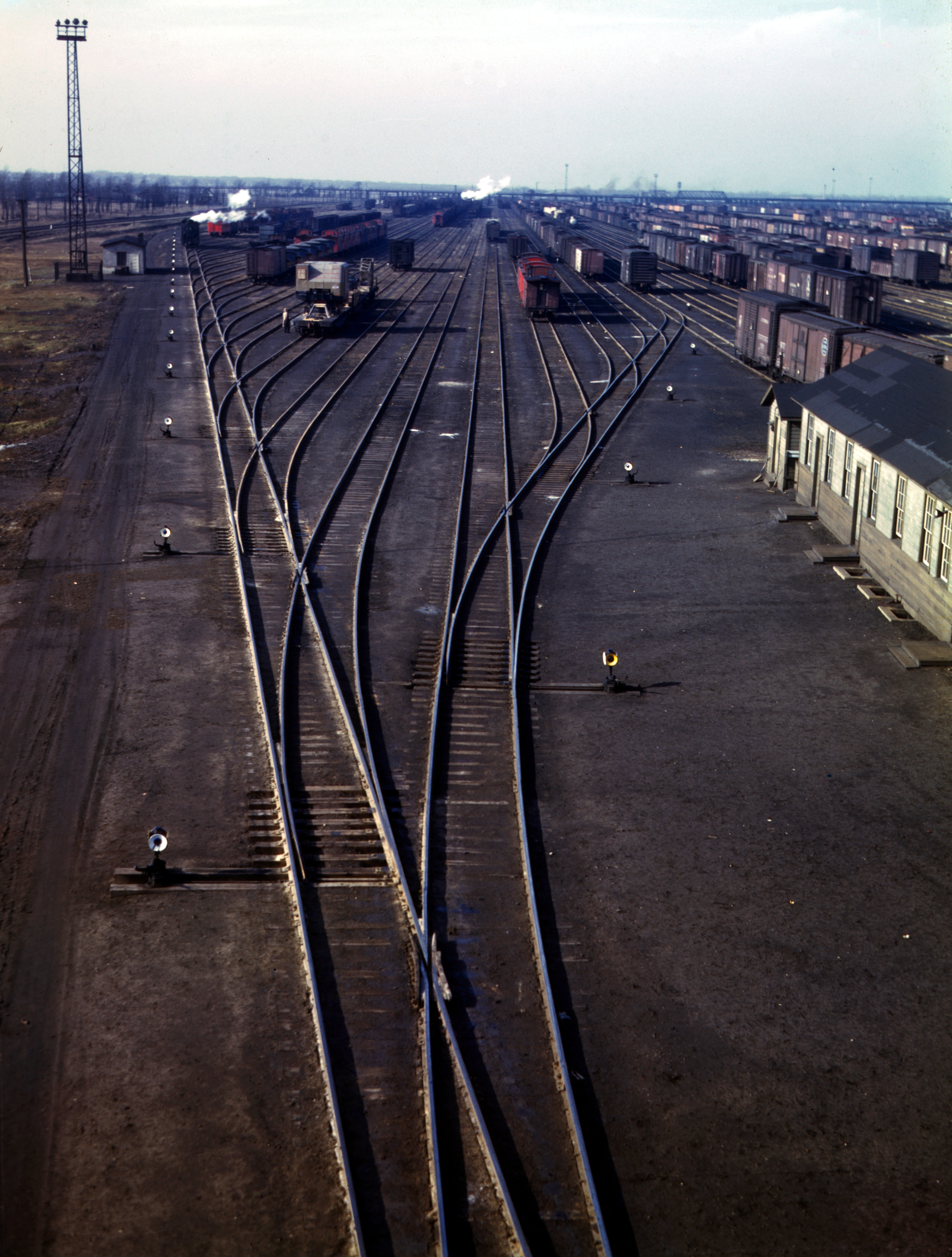
Railroad yard in Chicago, Illinois, as seen in December 1942

Yard
An arrangement of tracks where rolling stock is switched to and from trains, freight is loaded or unloaded, and consists made up.
Yellow
A color associated with a warning or a need to slow down when used by flags or signals, but the exact meaning varies from railway to railway.
Yoke

A bar or bent piece connection two pieces of the same kind.
Yoke Knee
See Guide Yoke Knee.
Yoke Sheet
See Guide Yoke Sheet.

== Z ==
Zig zag or switchback

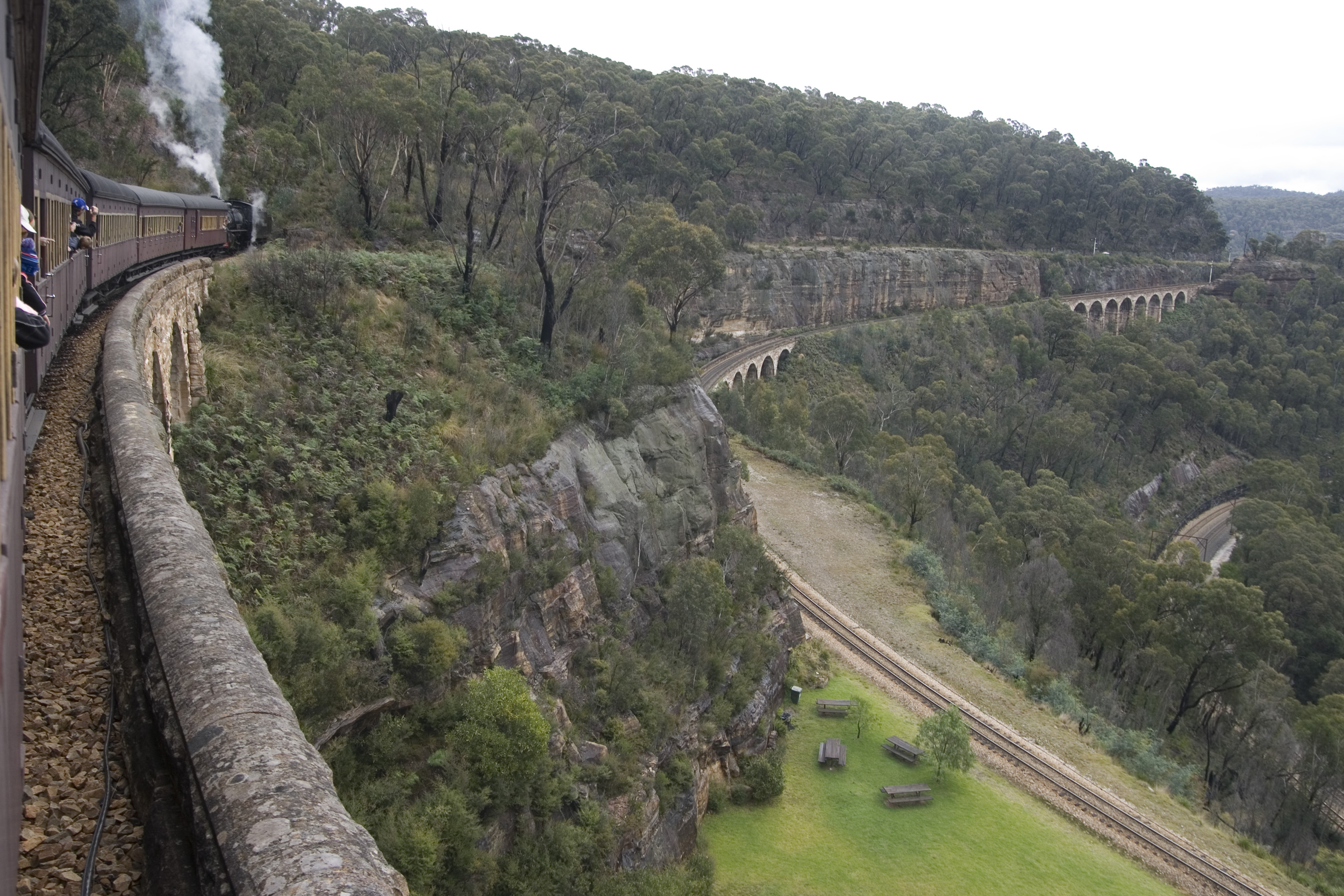
The Lithgow Zig Zag

A method of climbing and descending steep gradients, where shallow-gradient track reverses direction for a while, and then reverses again to continue in the original direction.

== See also ==
- Glossary of Australian railway terms
- Glossary of New Zealand railway terms
- Glossary of North American railway terms
- Glossary of United Kingdom railway terms
- List of railroad truck parts
- Passenger rail terminology
- Railway and tramway terminology in Europe
- Steam locomotive components
