= Jim Crow (disambiguation) =

Jim Crow laws were state and local laws that enforced racial segregation in the Southern United States.

Jim Crow or Jim Crowe may also refer to:

- Jim Crow (character), a persona created by white minstrel show performer Thomas D. Rice
- Jim Crow economy, the economic system in parts of the United States where anti-black laws were in force

== Places ==
- Jim Crow Creek (California)
- Harlows Creek (Washington), known as Jim Crow Creek until 2017
- Jim Crow goldfield, a mining and agricultural district in central Victoria, Australia
- Mount Baga, known as Mount Jim Crow until 2019, in Queensland, Australia, near Rockhampton
- Jim Crow Rock, or Puffin Rock, a painted rock in Hunters Quay, Scotland

== People ==
- James F. Crow (1916–2012), American population geneticist known as "Jim Crow" at University of Wisconsin-Madison
- James Chiles (1833–1873), also known as Jim Crow Chiles, American Confederate outlaw
- Jim Crow (footballer) (1885–1926), Australian rules footballer
- Jim Crowe (footballer) (1909–1979), Australian rules footballer
- Jim Robinson (trombonist) (1892–1976), nicknamed Jim Crow
- Jimmy Crow, aboriginal Australian, possible origin of the name of Crows Nest, Queensland

== Arts and entertainment ==
- Jim Crow, a character in the Disney film Dumbo, later renamed to Dandy Crow
- Jim Crow (group), an American rap group
- "Jump Jim Crow", an 1828 traditional slave song adapted and popularized by Thomas D. Rice

== Other uses ==
- Jim crow (tool), a tool for bending rails
- Jim Crow (typeface)
- The New Jim Crow, a 2010 book by Michelle Alexander

== See also ==
- James Crow (disambiguation)
- Jim Crow Creek (disambiguation)
- Juan Crow
