= FRA DOTX 219 =

American self-propelled track geometry car

FRA DOTX 219 T-19
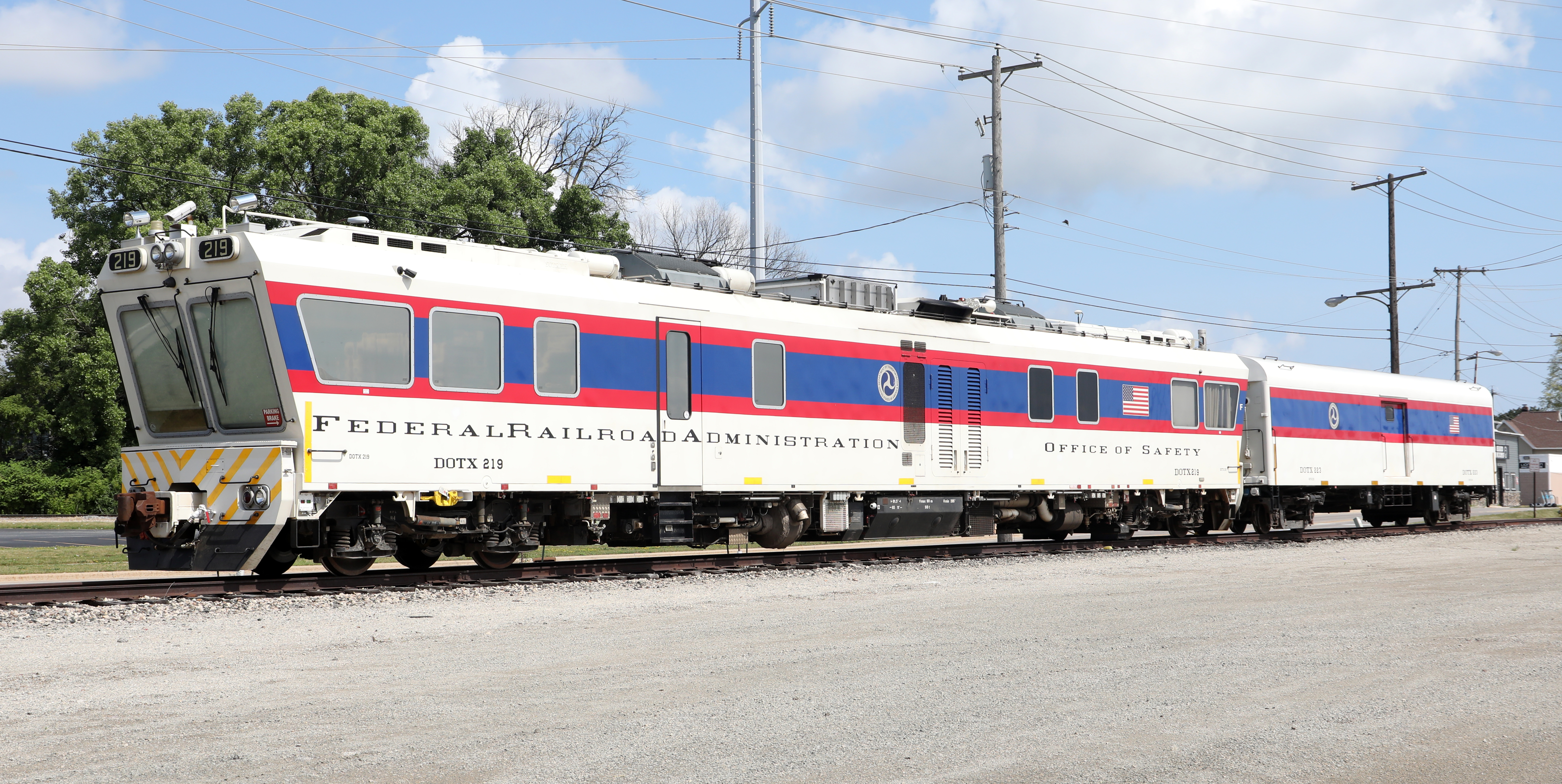
- DOTX 219 (left) paired with DOTX 223 (right) in Green Bay, Wisconsin, 2023
- Stock type: Track geometry car
- In service: 2007–present
- Manufacturers: ENSCO; Plasser & Theurer; Colorado Railcar
- Constructed: 2006
- Entered service: 2007
- Number built: 1
- Capacity: Up to 20 seats
- Owner: FRA (under ATIP)

Specifications
- Train length: Over couplers: 91 ft 10 in (27.99 m); Over body: 86 ft 11 in (26.49 m)
- Width: 10 ft 6 in (3.20 m)
- Height: 15 ft 4 in (4.67 m)
- Floor height: 53 3/8 in (1,360 mm)
- Wheel diameter: 3 ft (0.91 m)
- Wheelbase: In trucks: 8 ft 2.5 in (2.502 m); Between truck centers: 65 ft 11 in (20.09 m)
- Maximum speed: 90 mph (140 km/h)
- Weight: 212,700 lb (96,500 kg)
- Axle load: 52,300 lb (23,700 kg)
- Deceleration: Service brake: 2.5 mph/s (4.0 km/(h⋅s)); Emergency brake: 2.8 mph/s (4.5 km/(h⋅s))
- Auxiliaries: Satellite internet Public address system
- Power supply: 480-volt AC
- Minimum turning radius: 295 ft (90 m)
- Braking systems: Air, 1 disc per axle
- Coupling system: AAR Type F
- Track gauge: 1,435 mm (4 ft 8 1/2 in)

FRA DOTX 219 (commonly shortened to DOTX 219; originally known as T-19) is a self-propelled track geometry car owned by the Automated Track Inspection Program (ATIP), a division of the Federal Railroad Administration (FRA) in the United States. DOTX 219 measures several different aspects of track geometry, such as track gauge and rail cant. DOTX 219 was built by ENSCO, Plasser & Theurer, and Colorado Railcar, and began service in late April 2007. DOTX 219 and its collected data has had several uses, such as in train derailment investigations.

== Specifications ==
DOTX 219 has several systems onboard for measuring different aspects of track geometry. The Track Geometry Measurement System (TGMS) measures track gauge (the width between the rails), rail cant (how much higher one rail is to the other), and calculates speed limits for curves; the Transverse Rail Profile System (TRPS) measures rail profile (the shape of the rail) in real time; the Differential Global Positioning System DGMS/LDS (DGPS) uses a geographic coordinate system to give coordinates to a track defect; and the Ride Quality Measurement System (RQMS) measures the ride quality for passenger trains. DOTX 219 is able to use its measurement systems up to 125 miles per hour (201 km/h), and is able to process data up to 200 miles per hour (320 km/h). DOTX 219 can move under its own power, but it can also be towed by a locomotive. (Note: Some track geometry cars – such as DOTX 217, 218, and 219 – are self-propelled, while others – DOTX 216, 220, and 221 – require towing by a locomotive; however, all cars can be operated while being towed.)

DOTX 219 uploads its collected track data to the Track Data Management System (TDMS) — an archive of track data collected since 1998 — via the satellite-based Mobile Broadband Internet System (MBIS). (Note: The contents of the TDMS can be viewed and edited with the Microsoft Windows-based program GeoEdit.) The crew of DOTX 219 uses the Digital Survey Log (DSL) to log information about a survey's progress and delays. The crew also uses the Digital Track Notebook (DTN), a handheld computer which can be used as a reference manual for railroad regulations, and can synchronize data from the other measurement systems. DOTX 219 can determine if track is defective; however, it cannot determine if faultless track is about to become defective.

The amenities inside of DOTX 219 include closets, five lockers, one bathroom, a galley, a server room, and a rear observation area. DOTX 219 has operating controls only on its front end, which is designated with an "F". DOTX 219 has seating for 20 people, including the engineer: eight people in the rear observation area, four in the galley, four in the server room, and four in the front end. DOTX 219 is not fitted with cab signalling, automatic train stop, or automatic train control.

== History ==
The Automated Track Inspection Program (ATIP) is a division of the Federal Railroad Administration (FRA) which oversees automated track inspections on railroads in the United States. At the time, the FRA focused its automated track inspections for frequently used railroad lines, especially lines which carried hazardous materials and passengers. Track inspections would have to be automated, as opposed to manual inspections where subtle track defects would be difficult to identify.

DOTX 219 was built by ENSCO, Plasser & Theurer, and Colorado Railcar, as part of a contract for two new track geometry cars, with the other of which being DOTX 220. DOTX 219 and 220 were originally designated as T-19 and T-20, respectively. While DOTX 219 was under construction in March 2006, it was scheduled to be shipped from Linz, Austria to Galveston, Texas on December 15, 2006. DOTX 219 was delivered to the FRA in 2007. After DOTX 219 and 220 were delivered, there were five track geometry cars owned by the FRA; three were owned by ATIP and two were owned by the Office of Policy and Development. (Note: Several track geometry cars were subsequently obtained by the FRA, including DOTX 221, 225, and 226. The FRA also obtained the buffer car DOTX 223 and the hi-rail trucks DOTX 304 and 305.) The FRA anticipated DOTX 219 to enter service on March 1, 2007. DOTX 219 entered service in late April 2007.

== Operations ==
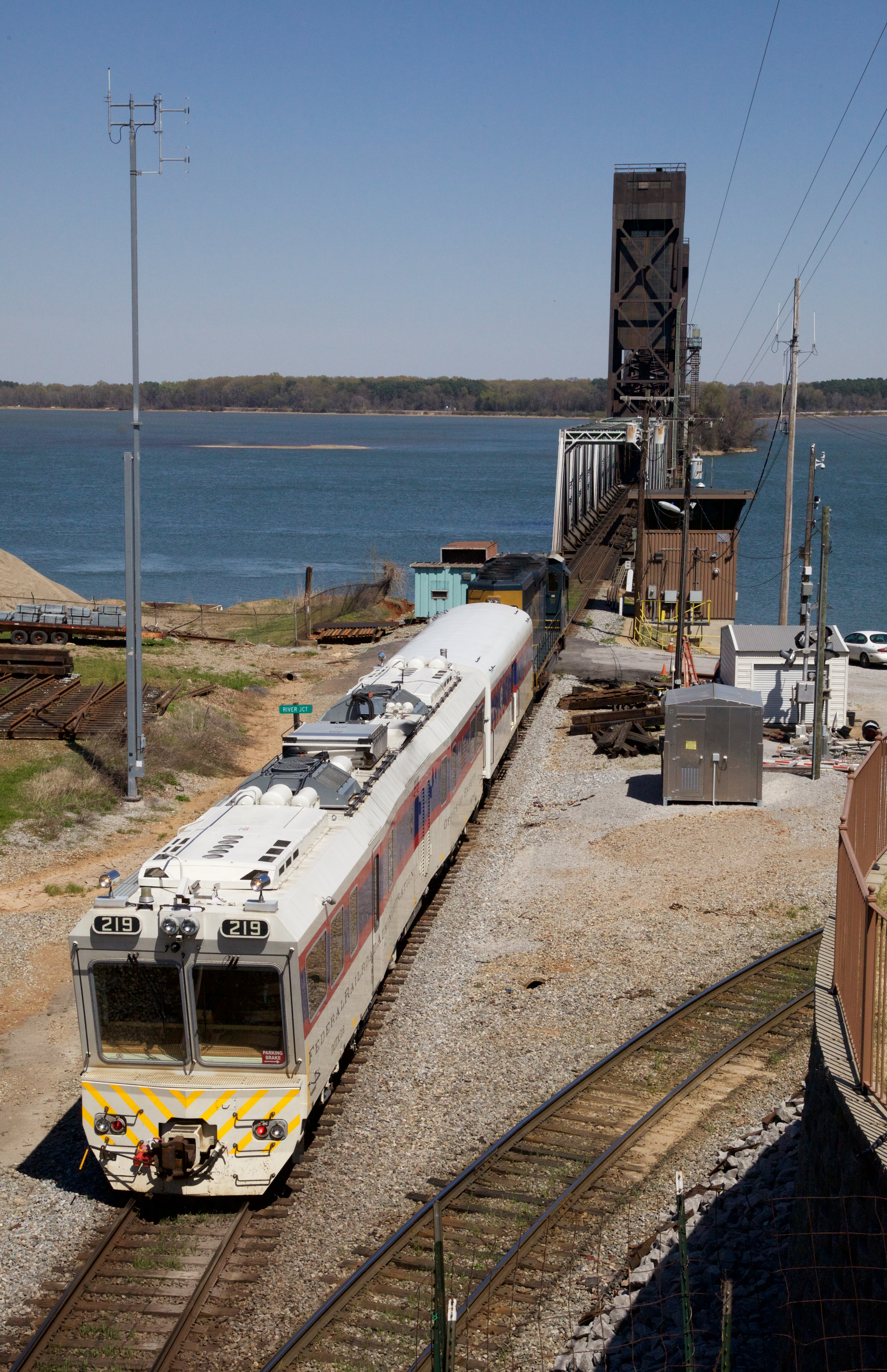
DOTX 219 and DOTX 223 being towed by an EMD GP40-3 in Decatur, Alabama, 2016

The predominant use of DOTX 219 is to perform track geometry inspections in the United States. After DOTX 219 entered service, the FRA would increase the frequency of its track inspections; DOTX 219 travelled 9,872 miles (15,887 km) in FY2008–09, and travelled 17,941 miles (28,873 km) in FY2009–10. Since 2015, DOTX 219 surveys about 30,000 miles (48,000 km) of track annually. As of 4 February 2026, DOTX 219 has been used for over 1,400 reports for track defects since January 27, 2016. DOTX 219 is frequently paired with DOTX 223 — a buffer car with no measurement systems — during inspections.

In 2006, ENSCO had contracted the FRA to perform testing with a DOT-111 tank car – which had been fitted with strain gauges, accelerometers, and a transducer for brake pressure – in order to determine the cause for fracturing on stub sills. DOTX 219 was connected with "the instrumented tank car" to provide coordinates and new track geometry data with the data measured by the tank car. From February 28, 2010, to March 2, 2010, DOTX 219 and the tank car were moved from Baldwin, Florida to Tampa, Florida. From March 4, 2010, to March 7, 2010, DOTX 219 and the tank car were moved three times between Tampa, Florida and Waycross, Georgia.

On April 1, 2011, the FRA published a final rule (CFR § 213.234) mandating automated track inspections to measure rail seat deterioration (Note: A rail seat is the location on a crosstie where the rails rest. When a track geometry car passes over a deteriorated concrete crosstie, the rails lower and affect the measurements for rail profile and rail cant.) "to within 1/8 of an inch [3.2 mm]" for tracks with concrete crossties, as a result of the Rail Safety Improvement Act of 2008. On May 27, 2011, the Association of American Railroads (AAR) sent a petition of reconsideration to the FRA for § 213.234(d), arguing that track geometry cars at the time could not "measure rail seat deterioration at all, let alone within 1/8 of an inch [3.2 mm]". While the FRA agreed that their track geometry cars could not measure rail seat deterioration, they also stated that measuring rail profile and rail cant – which can be measured by DOTX 219 – could be used to indicate possible locations for rail seat deterioration. The FRA further stated that automated track inspections should not be the sole method to find locations of rail seat deterioration, but should instead be used to assist in manual inspections.

The data collected by DOTX 219 has been used in train derailment investigations. The FRA used data from DOTX 219 for a derailment in Riddleville, Georgia, which occurred on August 7, 2015. DOTX 219 surveyed the location of the derailment on February 19, 2015, and found no defects. The National Transportation Safety Board (NTSB) launched an investigation for a derailment in Fort Worth, Texas, which occurred on April 24, 2019. A track inspection report created with DOTX 219 on April 10, 2012, was used in the investigation.
