= James Crowe =

James Crowe may refer to:

- James Crowe (surgeon), English surgeon and twice mayor of Norwich
- James Crowe (rugby union), Irish rugby union player
- James E. Crowe, American immunologist and virologist
- J. D. Crowe, American musician
- Jim Crowe (footballer), Australian rules footballer

== See also ==
- James Crow (disambiguation)
- Jim Crow (disambiguation)
