= T19 =

T19 or T-19 may refer to:

== Rail and transit ==
=== Lines ===
- T19 line, of the Stockholm Metro

=== Rolling stock ===
- Electron T19, a Ukrainian trolley bus
- GER Class T19, a British steam locomotive
- FRA DOTX 219 (originally known as T-19), an American track geometry car

=== Stations ===
- Hirabari Station, Nayoga, Aichi, Japan
- Minami-Gyōtoku Station, Ichikawa, Chiba, Japan
- Nakazakichō Station, Osaka, Japan
- Shin-Sapporo Station, Hokkaido, Japan
- Shido Station, Sanuki, Kagawa, Japan

== Other uses ==
- T-19, a Soviet tank
- T19 road (Tanzania)
- German torpedo boat T19
- Junkers T 19, a German trainer aircraft
- T19 Howitzer Motor Carriage, an American self-propelled gun
- T-19 Kestrel, the US military designation for the Game Composites GB1 GameBird
