= Cant deficiency =

When a rail vehicle's speed on a curved rail is high enough to begin tipping over

Cant deficiency: Resultant force exerts more against the outside rail than the inside rail.

In railway engineering, cant deficiency is defined in the context of travel of a rail vehicle at constant speed on a constant-radius curve. Cant itself refers to the superelevation of the curve, that is, the difference between the elevations of the outside and inside rails. Cant deficiency is present when a rail vehicle's speed on the curve is greater than the speed at which the components of wheel to rail force are normal to the plane of the track. In that case, the resultant force (aggregate gravitational and centrifugal force) exerts on the outside rail more than the inside rail, in which it creates lateral acceleration toward the outside of the curve (which could lead to tipping or derailing). In order to reduce cant deficiency, the speed can be reduced or the superelevation can be increased. The amount of cant deficiency is expressed in terms of required superelevation to be added in order to bring the resultant force into balance between the two rails.

On the contrary, it is said to be "cant excess" if the resultant force exerts more against the inside rail than the outside rail, for instance, a high superelevation curve with a train traveling at a low speed.

== Forces ==
The forces that bear on the vehicle in this context are illustrated in the following figure.

A vehicle's motion at speed v along a circular path embodies centripetal acceleration of magnitude $\tfrac{v^2}{R}$ toward the center of the circle, the curvature of that path being $\tfrac 1 R$ where R is the radius of the circle. This centripetal acceleration is produced by horizontal forces applied by the rails to the wheels of the vehicle, directed toward the center, and having sum equal to $\tfrac{Mv^2}{R}$ where M is the mass of the vehicle.

The net horizontal force producing the centripetal acceleration is generally separated into components that are respectively in the plane of the superelevated (i.e., banked) track and normal thereto.

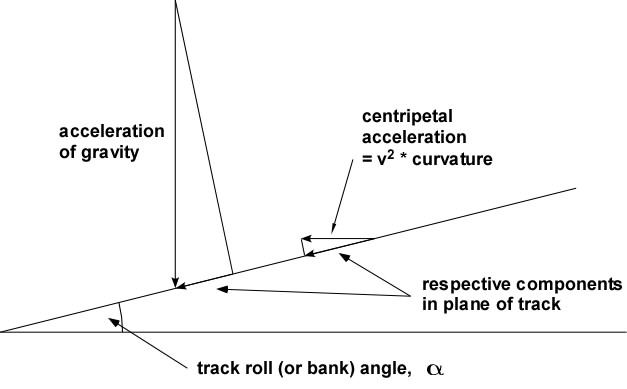

The component normal to the track acts together with the much larger component of gravitational force normal to the track and is generally neglected. It can slightly increase the vertical load seen by the vehicle suspension but it does not create lateral acceleration as perceived by passengers and does not cause lateral deflection of the vehicle suspension.

The track is superelevated so that the component of the acceleration of gravity in the plane of the track will provide some fraction of the horizontal acceleration in the plane of the track due to the circular motion. Referring to the figure above, it can be seen that the components of gravitational and centripetal acceleration in the plane of the track will be equal when the following balance equation is satisfied, where α is the bank angle.

$${v^2\over R} \cos \alpha = g \sin \alpha$$

For a given curve radius and bank angle (i.e., superelevation) the speed V that satisfies the balance equation is called the balancing speed and is given by

$$V_\text{bal} = \sqrt{Rg\tan\alpha}$$

For reasons that will be mentioned below, passenger vehicles usually traverse a curve at a speed higher than the balance speed. The amount by which the actual speed exceeds the balance speed is conveniently expressed via the so-called cant deficiency, i.e., by the amount by which the superelevation would need to be increased to raise the balance speed to the speed at which the vehicles actually travel. Letting GE denote the rail gauge from low rail gauge side corner to high rail field side corner, letting SE denote the actual superelevation, and letting V_{act} denote the actual speed, it follows from the definition that the cant deficiency, CD, is given by the formula

$$\mathrm{CD} = \frac{ \mathrm{GE} }{ \sqrt{1 + \frac{R^2 g^2}{V_\text{act}^4} } } - \mathrm{SE}$$

=== Example ===
Taking an example, a curve with curvature 1.0 degree per 100 ft chord (radius 1,746.40 m = 5,729.65 ft), GE = 1511.3 mm (59.5 inches), and SE = 152.4 mm (6.0 inches) will have

$$\begin{align}
V_\text{bal} &= \sqrt{1746.4 \cdot 9.80665 \cdot \tan( \arcsin( 152.4 / 1511.3 ) )} \\
&= 41.6638 \text{ m/s} = 149.99 \text{ km/h}  = 93.20 \text{ mph}
\end{align}$$

If a vehicle traverses that curve at a speed of 55.880 m/s (= 201.17 km/h = 125 mph), then the cant deficiency will be

$$\begin{align}
\mathrm{CD}  &= \frac{1511.3}{\sqrt{1 + (1746.4^2 \cdot 9.8066^2 / 55.8^4)}}- 152.4 \\
&= 118.7 \text{ mm } (= 4.67 \text{ in})
\end{align}$$

On routes that carry freight traffic in cars with the maximum allowed axle loads it will be desirable to set superelevations so that the balancing speed of each curve is close to the speed at which most such traffic runs. This is to lessen the tendency of heavy wheel loads to crush the head of either rail.

== Limit values ==
Allowed CD is set below the value that would be allowed based on safety in order to reduce wheel and rail wear and to reduce the rate of degradation of geometry of ballasted track. Choice of design CD will be less constrained by passenger comfort in the case of vehicles that have tilting capability. One historical approach to determining safe cant deficiency was the requirement that the projection to the plane of the track of the resultant of the inertial and gravitational forces acting on a vehicle fall within the middle third of the track gauge. Contemporary engineering studies would likely use vehicle motion simulation including cross wind conditions to determine margins relative to derailment and rollover.

If the superelevation determined for a dedicated passenger route curve on regulatory and safety bases is below 6 in (152.4 mm) it may be desirable to increase the superelevation and reduce the cant deficiency. However, if on such a curve some trains regularly travel at low speeds, then raising the superelevation may be inadvisable for passenger comfort reasons.

On a mixed traffic route owned by a freight rail company, freight considerations are likely to prevail. On a mixed traffic route owned by a passenger rail company some kind of compromise may be needed.

Cant deficiency is generally looked at with respect to ideal track geometry. As geometry of real track is never perfect it may be desirable to supplement the static considerations laid out above with simulations of vehicle motion over measured geometries of actual tracks. Simulations are also desirable for understanding vehicle behaviour traversing spirals, turnouts, and other track segments where curvature changes with distance by design. Where simulations or measurements show non-ideal behaviour traversing traditional linear spirals, results can be improved by using advanced spirals. Good track geometry including advanced spirals is likely to foster passenger acceptance of higher CD values.

=== United States ===
For passenger traffic superelevations and authorized speeds can be set so that trains run with as much cant deficiency as is allowed, based on safety, on relevant regulations and on passenger comfort. As of 2007 the US Federal Railroad Administration regulations limit CD to 7 in (178 mm) for tilting passenger vehicles, 3 in (76 mm) for conventional vehicles. This FRA regulation is based on AAR standards based on a single study in the 1950s on a rail line in Connecticut. In Germany, where axle loads are typically lower than those in the USA, tilting trains are allowed to operate with 12 in (305 mm) CD in some cases. CD above 6 in (152 mm) can be considered too uncomfortable for passengers (e.g. things on tables might slide off), except for tilting trains.

The FRA issued new information on cant deficiency in 2009 under FRA-2009-0036-0003. Due to the circumstances outlined, the federal regulations on cant deficiency were amended such that any rail vehicle may operate with up to 3 inches of cant deficiency and any vehicle that is to be operated above this number must be approved by the FRA for such operations. Approval is governed by conditions outlined in CFR chapter 49 section 213.329 part (d) and based on the idea that the car cannot unload the inside wheel on a curve by more than 60% of static loading.

=== Europe ===
France and Germany allow trains on conventional lines to operate at up to 6-inch (152 mm) cant deficiency. TGV has limit on cant deficiency of 4 inches (102 mm).

== See also ==
- Cant (road/rail)
