= Superelevation =

Superelevation may refer to

- Cant (road/rail), the difference in elevation between two edges of a road or railway track
- Elevation (ballistics) § Superelevation, the correction for gravitational fall of a projectile
