= Track car =

Track car may refer to

- Half-track, military vehicles with both regular wheels and continuous tracks
- Model car, for use on a toy racing track
  - Slot car, a powered miniature auto or other vehicle that is guided by a groove or slot in the track on which it runs
- Safety car or pace car, a car which limits the speed of competing vehicles on a racetrack during caution period or parade lap
- Track day car, a road car designed solely or principally for track days
- Track geometry car or track recording car, an automated railway inspection vehicle
