= James Crow =

James Crow may be the name of:

- James C. Crow (fl. 19th century) (1789–1856), Scottish creator of the sour mash process for making Bourbon Whiskey
- James F. Crow (1916–2012), American genetics professor

== See also ==
- Jim Crow (disambiguation)
- James Crowe (disambiguation)
