= Jim Crow Creek =

Jim Crow Creek may refer to:

== United States ==
- Jim Crow Creek (California)
- Jim Crow Creek (Washington)

== Other places ==
- Jim Crow Creek (Victoria), Australia, the former name of Larni Barramal Yaluk, a tributary of the Loddon River
