= Buffer car =

Nonhazardous railroad car

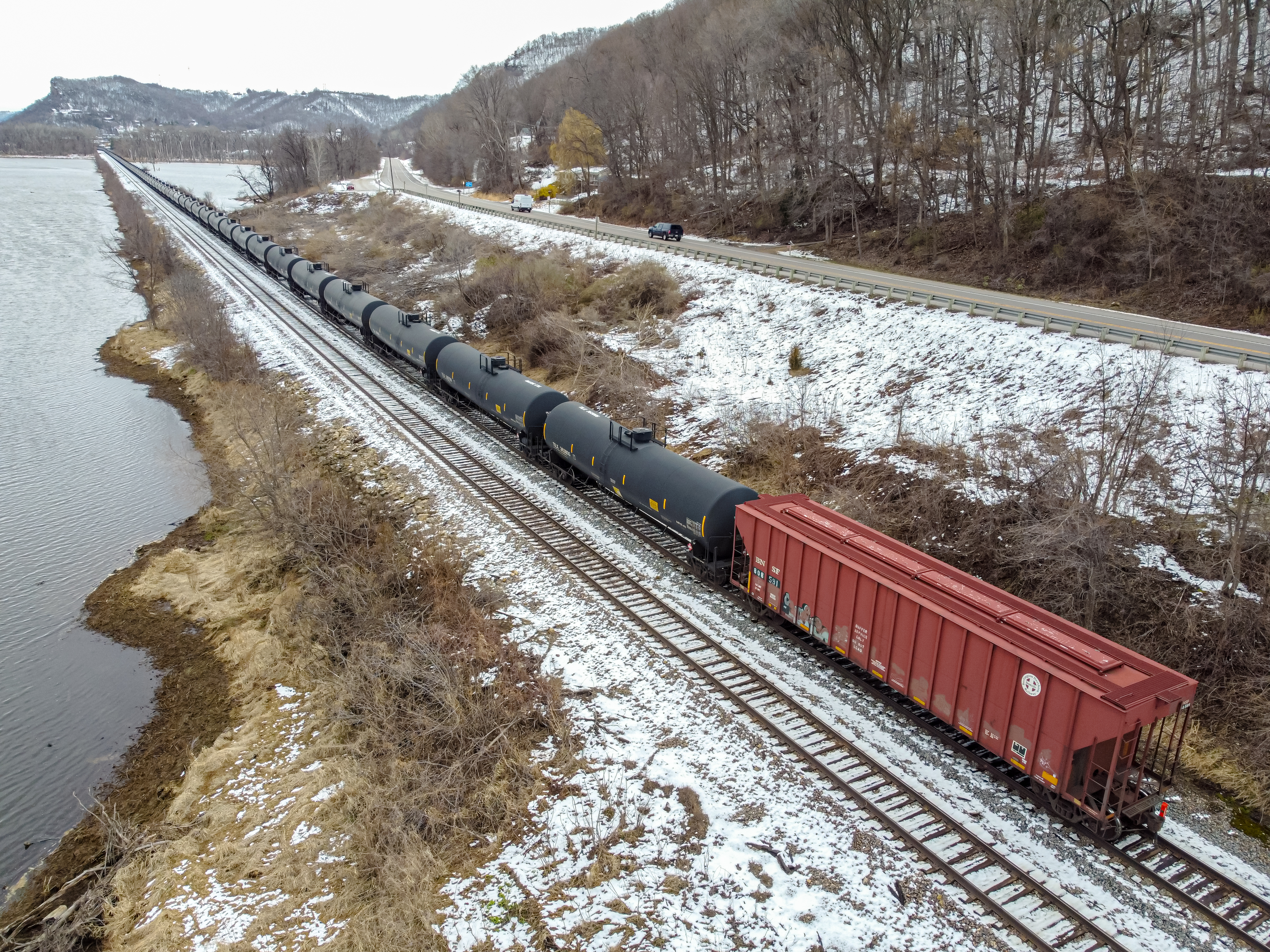
A freight train in the US, with a hopper car used as a buffer car at the end of the train. A message on the hopper car reads: "Buffer Service Only / Do Not Load".

In North American railroad terminology, a buffer car is a nonhazardous railroad car used to separate a locomotive from freight cars carrying hazardous materials, and to act as a shock absorber in the event of a collision or derailment. Buffer cars originated after the end of the American Civil War in 1865, as a result of mislabeled explosives igniting during transport by rail. Buffer cars remain in use in the United States and Canada.

Buffer cars vary in type, length, and weight; examples of buffer car types include hopper cars, boxcars, gondola cars, and flatcars. Buffer cars may be used at both ends of a train, even if a locomotive is not present at both ends. The US and Canada had used five buffer cars to separate hazardous freight cars from locomotives in unit trains; in 2002, Canada changed their regulation to separate the two by only one buffer car. For manifest trains, one buffer car is used in the US, and no buffer cars are used in Canada.

== History ==
Buffer cars originated in the United States after the end of the American Civil War in 1865, as a result of mislabeled explosives and ammunitions that ignited during transport by rail. The earliest regulation for buffer cars required freight cars with explosives to be separated "at least 16 cars from the engine and 10 cars from the caboose", or otherwise in the middle of the train. The regulation was changed in 1922, which required freight cars to be separated at least five cars from the locomotive or caboose, or in the middle of the train; the requirement was the standard used by both the United States and Canada until 2002.

Buffer cars serve several purposes in trains: buffer cars act as a shock absorber in the event of a collision or derailment, separate freight cars from locomotives, and inhibit flammable materials from igniting due to locomotives. Buffer cars vary in type, length, and weight, depending on the country and railroad.

=== In the United States ===
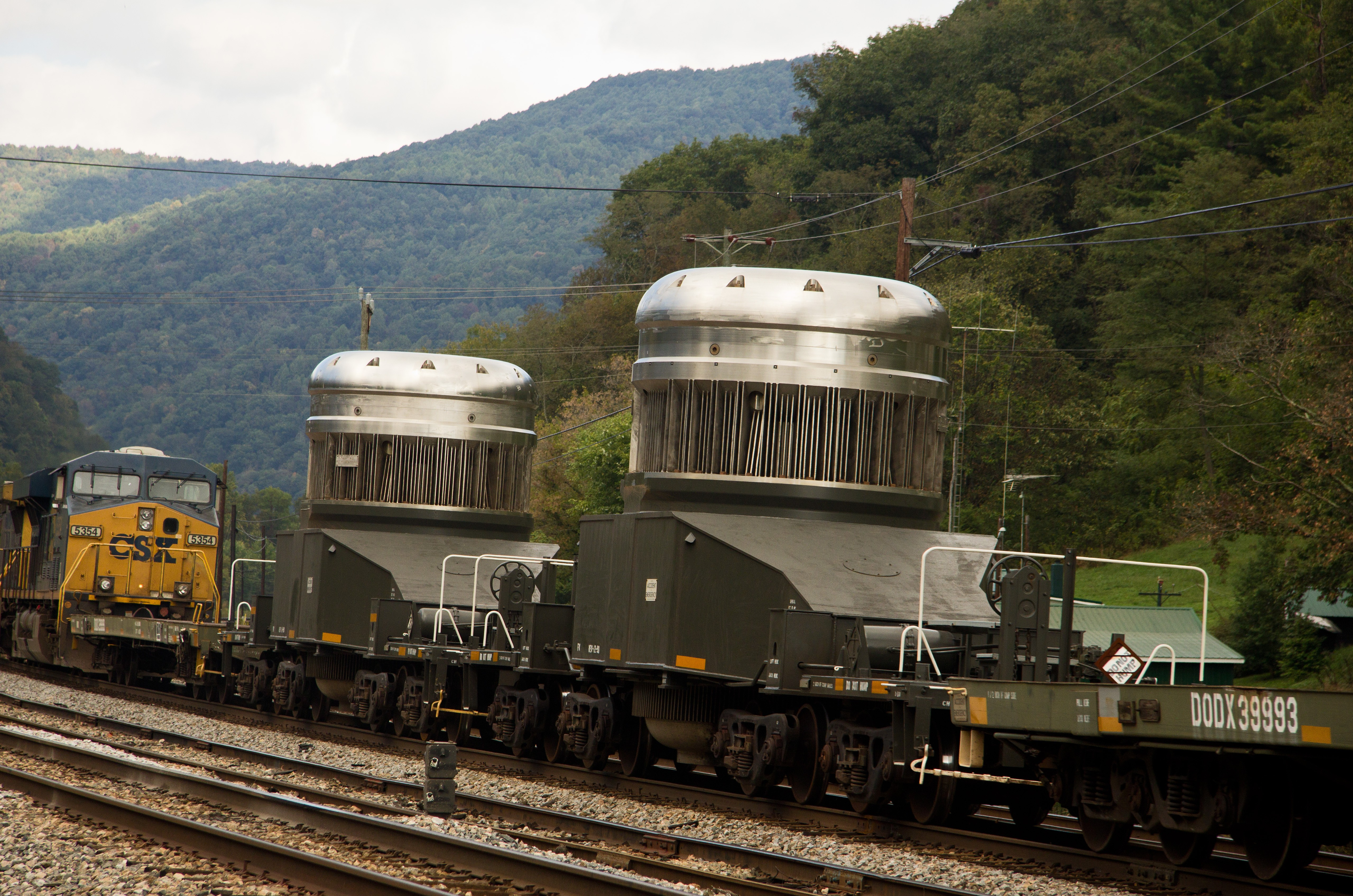
A freight train carrying nuclear flasks, with flatcars as buffer cars

While the term "buffer car" is used by government agencies in the US, the term is not present in the regulation describing it. The National Transportation Safety Board (NTSB) defined a buffer car as "nonplacarded [nonhazardous] cars that are used to separate locomotives from hazardous materials freight cars". In the US, locomotives are separated from hazardous freight cars by five buffer cars in manifest trains, and by one buffer car in unit trains. Buffer cars have been used to separate locomotives from freight cars carrying nuclear flasks, containing spent nuclear fuel (SNF) and high-level waste (HLW); DOT-111 tank cars carrying flammable materials, such as crude oil; and track geometry cars.

In the US, there is no specific definition for what is considered a buffer car; as a result, buffer cars vary in their type, length, and weight. A railroad typically defines the standards for buffer cars on their railroad line. For example, the Union Pacific requires a buffer car to be a boxcar, covered hopper, gondola car, or tank car; in addition, the length of a buffer car must be between 45–75 feet (14–23 m). The United States Navy uses flatcars as buffer cars for trains carrying SNF. Older freight cars—such as the 4180 Airslide covered hopper cars, which were used from the 1980s to the 2000s—have been repurposed into buffer cars. Freight trains typically have buffer cars on both ends of the train, even if locomotives are not present on both ends of the train. The use of buffer cars on both ends allows for safe movement in both directions.

Buffer cars have been used in tests throughout the 20th century. In a 1962 test pertaining to coupling forces, empty hopper cars were used as buffer cars. In two studies conducted in the 1970s pertaining to the aerodynamics of freight trains, flatcars—both loaded with trailers and empty—were used as buffer cars. In 2018, a 66-foot (20 m) flatcar built by Kasgro Rail was tested for use as a buffer car. The flatcar weighed 263,000 pounds (119,000 kg), with 196,000 pounds (89,000 kg) of the weight being from ballast mounted to the flatcar as steel plates. The buffer car was meant to be used for trains carrying SNF and HLW.

=== In Canada ===
Before 2002, five buffer cars were required in manifest trains, and no buffer cars were required in unit trains. In 2002, the regulation was changed to require only one buffer car in manifest trains, and none in unit trains. In a similar manner to the United States, a railroad creates their own requirements for a buffer car. For example, the Canadian Pacific Railway requires a buffer car to be either a boxcar or a hopper car. In addition, a buffer car shorter than 32 feet (9.8 m) cannot be coupled to a freight car longer than 65 feet (20 m), and a buffer car shorter than 41 feet (12 m) cannot be coupled to a freight car longer than 80 feet (24 m). Some unit trains have been given exceptions; for example, a Canadian producer of sulfuric acid was granted an exception, and operated unit trains without buffer cars.

In October 2022, VIA Rail added buffer cars to the end of their passenger trains; the buffer cars were used to protect the passengers and crew of the trains in a collision. Buffer cars were implemented due to concerns regarding their "aging" stainless steel passenger cars, which were built by the American manufacturer Budd Company in the 1950s. The cars had noticeable structural defects, and had been damaged during subsequent tests conducted by VIA Rail. The buffer cars were repealed on May 18, 2023.

== See also ==
- Buffer (rail transport)
- Glossary of North American railway terms
