= James Crowe (rugby union) =

Irish rugby union player

- Born: 21 November 1952 (age 73) Dublin, Republic of Ireland
- University: University College Dublin
- Notable relative: Morgan Crowe (father)

Rugby union career
- Position: Centre
International career
Years	Team	Apps	(Points)
1974	Ireland	1	(0)

James Crowe (born 21 November 1952) is an Irish former rugby union international.

Born in Dublin, Crowe is the son of Morgan Crowe, who was capped 13 times for Ireland.

Crowe, a University College Dublin player, gained his only Ireland cap in 1974, as a centre against the touring All Blacks at Lansdowne Road. He played his provincial rugby for Leinster.

== See also ==
- List of Ireland national rugby union players
