= Railway engineering =

Study of engineering principles necessary for railway construction and operation

Railway engineering is the discipline of engineering which concerns the design, construction, operation, and maintenance of railways and rail transportation systems. It includes a wide range of engineering disciplines, including (but not limited to) civil engineering, computer engineering, electrical engineering, mechanical engineering, industrial engineering and production engineering.

== History ==
In the seventeenth and eighteenth century, the first railways were built for the horse-drawn trains of wagons in collieries and quarries, with the first materials consisting of stone slabs and timber baulks. However, the rails were weary with carrying heavier loads.

During the Industrial Revolution, cast iron were added to the railway tracks to reduce the wear on the wooden baulks, which evolved further into iron edge rails, which enabled to flanged wheels' utility.

In the early nineteenth century, as the locomotives came into the picture, wrought iron rails and steel rails developed to support heavy axle loads without longitudinal timbers. With the advent of the railway, a need arose for specialized engineers capable of dealing with the unique problems associated with railway engineering. As the railways expanded and became a major part in logistics, more engineers became involved in the field, probably the most notable in Britain being Richard Trevithick, George Stephenson and Isambard Kingdom Brunel.

In the modern 21st century concept, a railway engineer must also effectively be well versed in civil engineering so far as utilities such as water, drainage, water table level, natural gas, electric and internet lines are concerned. The engineer also must understand concepts such as working with a brownfield project, where sometimes parts of an abandoned line are reactivated and others are left decommissioned. They must also be able to work within a business environment, where sometimes expansion of railway lines depends entirely on business profits.

== Subfields ==
- Mechanical engineering
- Electrical engineering
  - Command, control & railway signalling
    - SCADA
    - Network design
- Civil engineering
  - Permanent way engineering
- Railway systems engineering
  - Railway signalling
  - Fare collection
  - CCTV
  - Public address
  - Intrusion detection
  - Access control
- Computer engineering
  - Systems integration

== Professional organisations ==
- In Australia and New Zealand: the Railway Technical Society of Australasia (RTSA)
- In the UK: the Railway Division of the Institution of Mechanical Engineers (IMechE)
- In the US: the American Railway Engineering and Maintenance-of-Way Association (AREMA)
- In the Philippines: the Philippine Railway Engineers' Association, (PREA) Inc.
- Worldwide: the Institute of Railway Signal Engineers (IRSE)

== See also ==
- Association of American Railroads
- Exsecant
- Degree of curvature
- List of engineering topics
- List of engineers
- Minimum railway curve radius
- Radius of curvature (applications)
- Track transition curve
- Transition curve

=== Glossary ===
- Light rail systems
- On-track plant
- Train control systems
  - Cab signalling
- Rolling resistance
  - Curve resistance
- Wheel–rail interface
  - Hunting oscillation
- Energy electrification
  - Third rail
    - Fourth rail
  - Overhead contact system
