= Jim Crow (footballer) =

Australian rules footballer

Personal information
- Full name: James Harold Crow
- Born: 31 October 1885; Lalor, Victoria
- Died: 7 September 1926 (aged 40); South Melbourne, Victoria
- Original team: Essendon District

Playing career^{1}
Years	Club	Games (Goals)
1909–10	St Kilda	4 (1)
- ^{1} Playing statistics correct to the end of 1910.

James Harold Crow (31 October 1885 – 7 September 1926) was an Australian rules footballer who played with St Kilda in the Victorian Football League (VFL).
