= Jim crow (tool) =

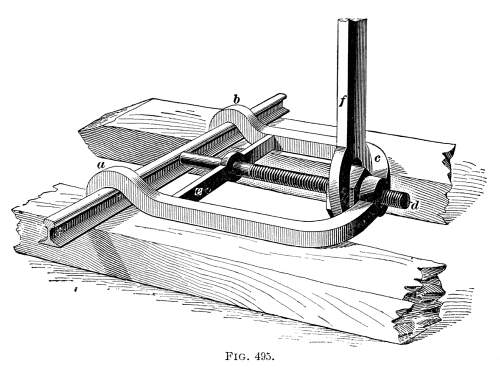
Illustration of a Jim crow from A Textbook on Civil Engineering — International Correspondence Schools published in 1899 by the Colliery Engineer Company.

A jim crow or rail bender is a tool for bending rails, consisting of a U-shaped or V-shaped armature with a hefty screw rod in its axis. Deluxe models are outfitted with rollers for continuous bending.

== Practice ==
Railway rails are quite flexible and bend easily to radii of 400 m (440 yd) or more. The jim crow is needed to bend rails to tighter radii, especially near the ends.
