= Banked turn =

Inclination of road or surface other than flat

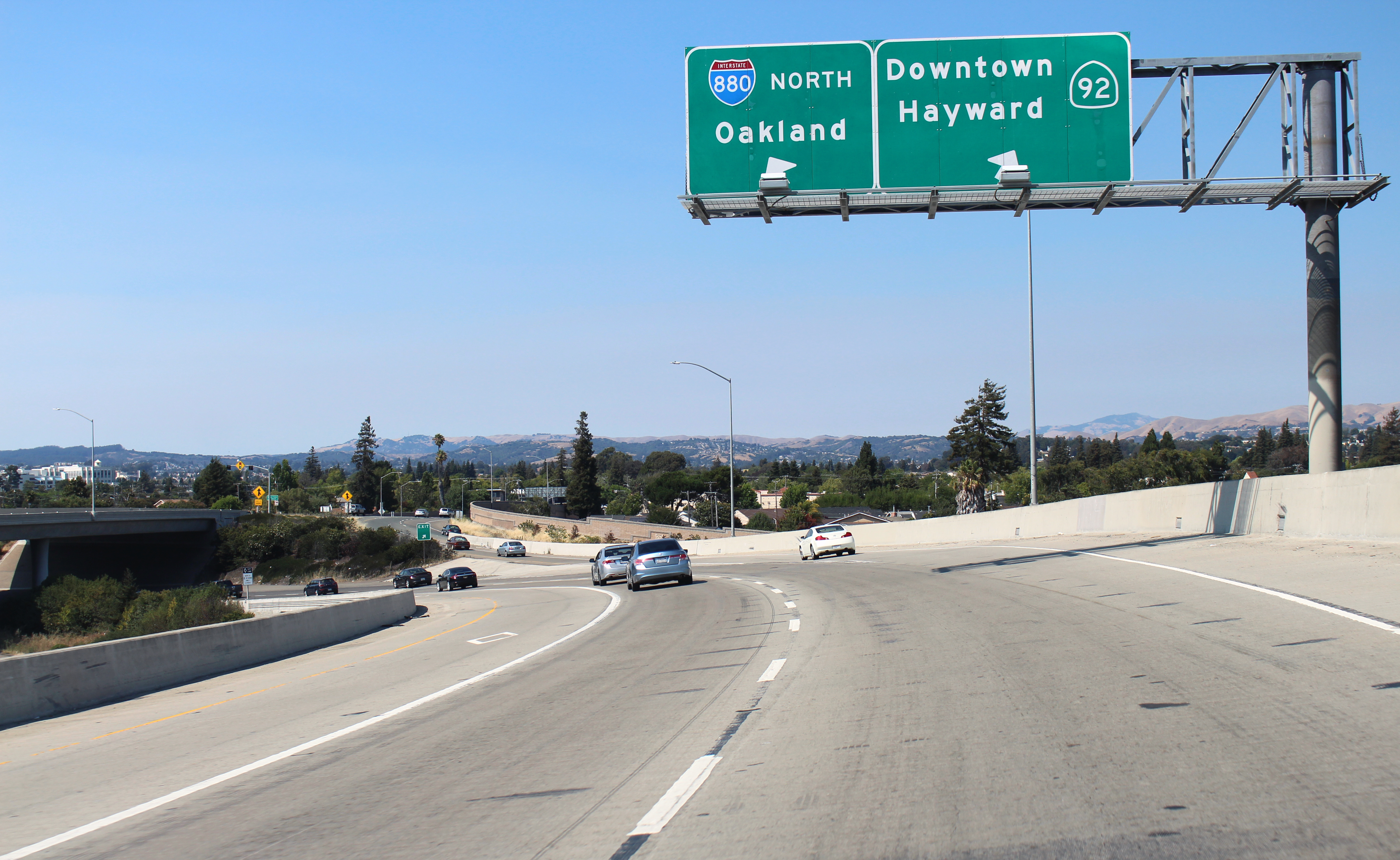
A steeply banked turn on a ramp connecting eastbound California State Route 92 to northbound Interstate 880 in Hayward, California.

A banked turn (or banking turn) is a turn or change of direction in which the vehicle banks or inclines, usually towards the inside of the turn. For a road or railroad this is usually due to the roadbed having a transverse down-slope towards the inside of the curve. The bank angle is the angle at which the vehicle is inclined about its longitudinal axis with respect to the horizontal.

== Formulations ==
=== Turn on flat surfaces ===
If the bank angle is zero, the surface is flat and the normal force is vertically upward. The only force keeping the vehicle turning on its path is friction, or traction. This must be large enough to provide the centripetal force, a relationship that can be expressed as an inequality, assuming the car is driving in a circle of radius $r$:

$$\mu mg > {mv^2\over r}.$$

The expression on the right hand side is the centripetal acceleration multiplied by mass, the force required to turn the vehicle. The left hand side is the maximum frictional force, which equals the coefficient of friction $\mu$ multiplied by the normal force. Rearranging the maximum cornering speed is

$$v < \sqrt{r\mu g}.$$

Note that $\mu$ can be the coefficient for static or dynamic friction. In the latter case, where the vehicle is skidding around a bend, the friction is at its limit and the inequalities becomes equations. This also ignores effects such as downforce, which can increase the normal force and cornering speed.

=== Frictionless banked turn ===
Upper panel: Ball on a banked circular track moving with constant speed $v$; Lower panel: Forces on the ball. The resultant or net force on the ball found by vector addition of the normal force exerted by the road and vertical force due to gravity must equal the required force for centripetal acceleration dictated by the need to travel a circular path.

As opposed to a vehicle riding along a flat circle, inclined edges add an additional force that keeps the vehicle in its path and prevents a car from being "dragged into" or "pushed out of" the circle (or a railroad wheel from moving sideways so as to nearly rub on the wheel flange). This force is the horizontal component of the vehicle's normal force (N). In the absence of friction, the normal force is the only one acting on the vehicle in the direction of the center of the circle. Therefore, as per Newton's second law, we can set the horizontal component of the normal force equal to mass multiplied by centripetal acceleration:

$${mv^2\over r} = N\sin \theta$$

Because there is no motion in the vertical direction, the sum of all vertical forces acting on the system must be zero. Therefore, we can set the vertical component of the vehicle's normal force equal to its weight:

$$N\cos \theta =mg$$

Solving the above equation for the normal force and substituting this value into our previous equation, we get:

$${mv^2\over r}= {mg\tan \theta}$$

This is equivalent to:

$${v^2\over r}= {g\tan \theta}$$

Solving for velocity we have:

$$v= {\sqrt{rg\tan \theta}}$$

This provides the velocity that in the absence of friction and with a given angle of incline and radius of curvature, will ensure that the vehicle will remain in its designated path. The magnitude of this velocity is also known as the "rated speed" (or "balancing speed" for railroads) of a turn or curve. Notice that the rated speed of the curve is the same for all massive objects, and a curve that is not inclined will have a rated speed of 0.

=== Banked turn with friction ===
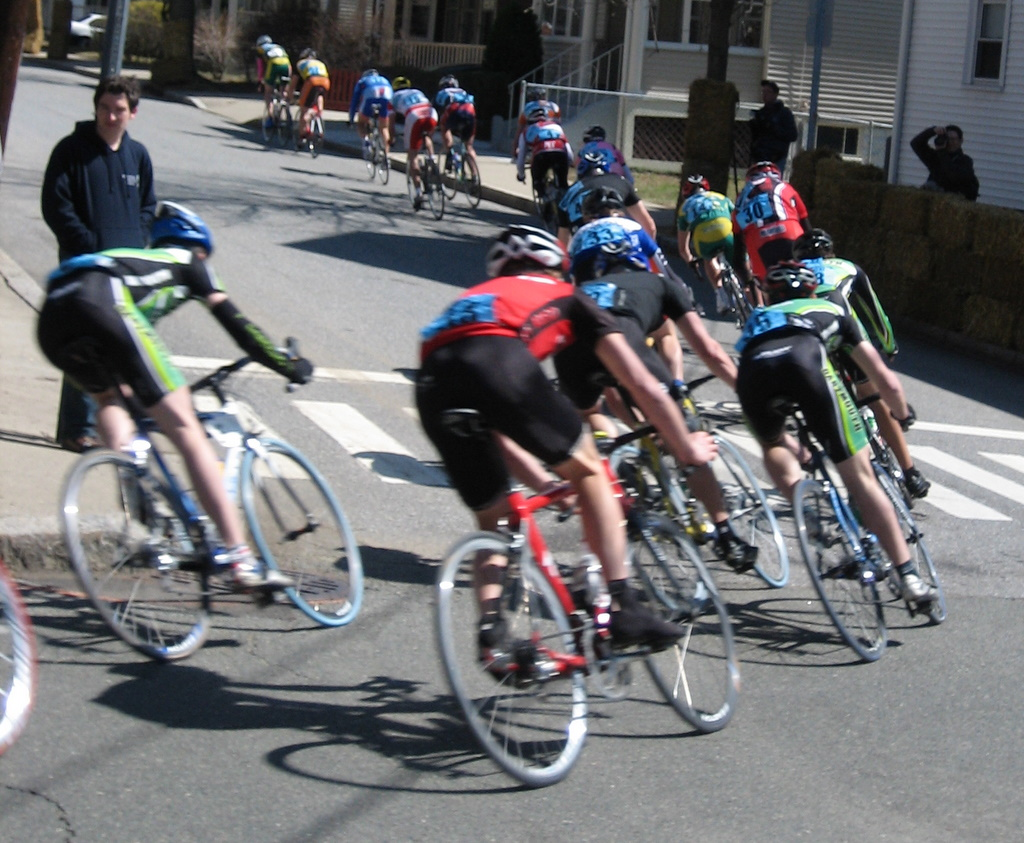
Cyclists take a tight downhill corner in the Beanpot Criterium at Tufts University.

When considering the effects of friction on the system, once again we need to note which way the friction force is pointing. When calculating a maximum velocity for our automobile, friction will point down the incline and towards the center of the circle. Therefore, we must add the horizontal component of friction to that of the normal force. The sum of these two forces is our new net force in the direction of the center of the turn (the centripetal force):

$$\underbrace{{mv^2\over r} = N\sin \theta}_\text{Frictionless formula} + \underbrace{\mu_s N\cos \theta}_\text{Friction term}$$

Once again, there is no motion in the vertical direction, allowing us to set all opposing vertical forces equal to one another. These forces include the vertical component of the normal force pointing upwards and both the car's weight and the vertical component of friction pointing downwards:

$$\underbrace{N\cos \theta = mg}_\text{Frictionless formula} + \underbrace{\mu_s N\sin \theta}_\text{Friction term}$$

By solving the above equation for mass and substituting this value into our previous equation we get:

$$\frac{\frac{N\cos\theta-\mu_sN\sin\theta}{g}v^2}{r}= N\sin\theta+\mu_sN\cos\theta$$

Solving for $v$ we get:

$$v_\mathrm{max}= \sqrt{rg\left(\sin \theta +\mu_s \cos \theta \right)\over \cos \theta -\mu_s \sin \theta }
=\sqrt{rg\frac{\tan\theta+\mu_s}{1-\mu_s\tan\theta}} = \sqrt{rg\tan(\theta+\theta_\mathrm{crit})}$$

Where $\theta_\mathrm{crit}$ is the critical angle, such that $\tan\theta_\mathrm{crit}=\mu_s$. This equation provides the maximum velocity for the automobile with the given angle of incline, coefficient of static friction and radius of curvature. By a similar analysis of minimum velocity, the following equation is rendered:

$$v_\mathrm{min}= \sqrt{rg\left(\sin \theta -\mu_s \cos \theta \right)\over \cos \theta +\mu_s \sin \theta }
=\sqrt{rg\frac{\tan\theta-\mu_s}{1+\mu_s\tan\theta}} = \sqrt{rg\tan(\theta-\theta_\mathrm{crit})}$$

Notice

$$\frac{v_\mathrm{min}}{v_\mathrm{max}} = \sqrt{\frac{\tan(\theta-\theta_\mathrm{crit})}{\tan(\theta+\theta_\mathrm{crit})}}$$

The difference in the latter analysis comes when considering the direction of friction for the minimum velocity of the automobile (towards the outside of the circle). Consequently, opposite operations are performed when inserting friction into equations for forces in the centripetal and vertical directions.

Improperly banked road curves increase the risk of run-off-road and head-on crashes. A 2% deficiency in superelevation (say, 4% superelevation on a curve that should have 6%) can be expected to increase crash frequency by 6%, and a 5% deficiency will increase it by 15%. Up until now, highway engineers have been without efficient tools to identify improperly banked curves and to design relevant mitigating road actions. A modern profilograph can provide data of both road curvature and cross slope (angle of incline). A practical demonstration of how to evaluate improperly banked turns was developed in the EU Roadex III project. See the linked referenced document below.

== Examples ==
=== In aeronautics ===
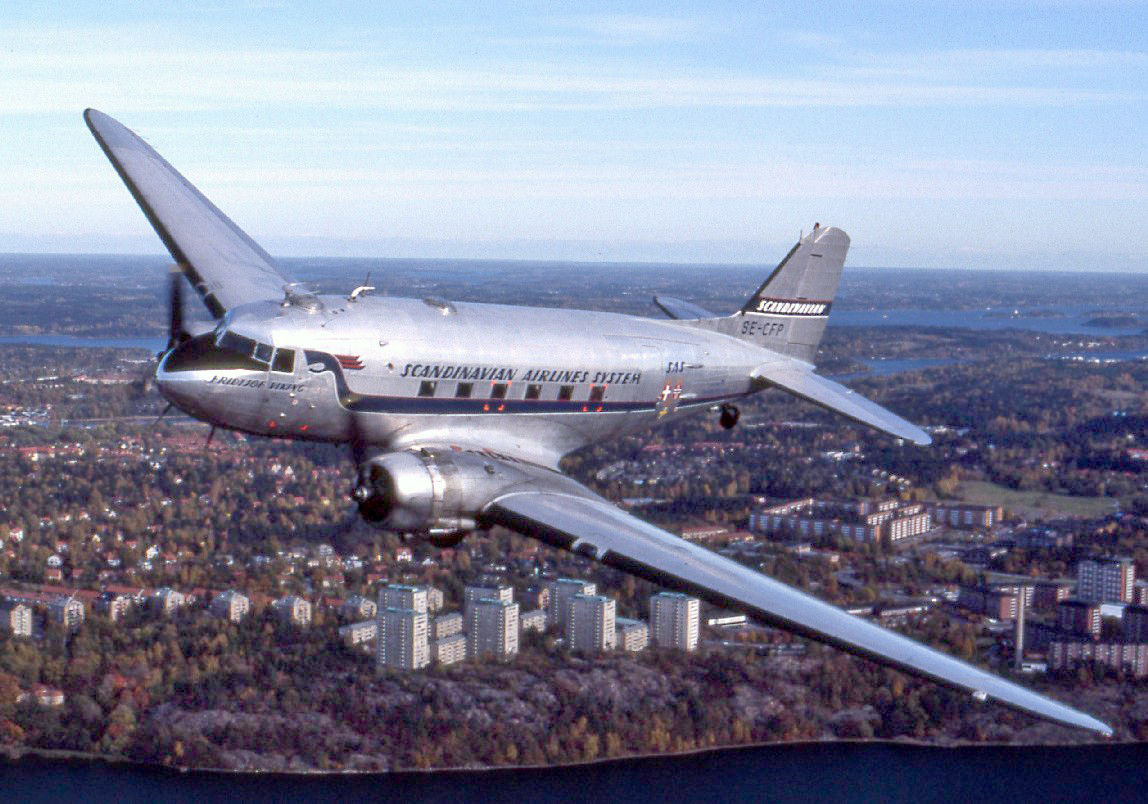
Douglas DC-3 banking to make a left turn.

When a fixed-wing aircraft is making a turn (changing its direction) the aircraft must roll to a banked position so that its wings are angled towards the desired direction of the turn. When the turn has been completed the aircraft must roll back to the wings-level position in order to resume straight flight.

When any moving vehicle is making a turn, it is necessary for the forces acting on the vehicle to add up to a net inward force, to cause centripetal acceleration. In the case of an aircraft making a turn, the force causing centripetal acceleration is the horizontal component of the lift acting on the aircraft.

In straight, level flight, the lift acting on the aircraft acts vertically upwards to counteract the weight of the aircraft which acts downwards. If the aircraft is to continue in level flight (i.e. at constant altitude), the vertical component must continue to equal the weight of the aircraft and so the pilot must pull back on the stick to apply the elevators to pitch the nose up, and therefore increase the angle of attack, generating an increase in the lift of the wing. The total (now angled) lift is greater than the weight of the aircraft, The excess lift is the horizontal component of the total lift, which is the net force causing the aircraft to accelerate inward and execute the turn.

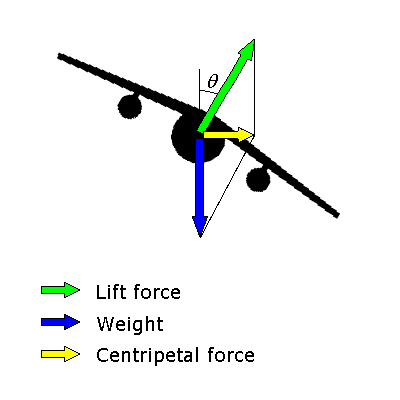
Vector diagram showing lift and weight acting on a fixed-wing aircraft during a banked turn. The yellow force depicted represents the net resultant force that causes centripetal acceleration.

Because centripetal acceleration is:

$$a = {v^2\over r}$$

During a balanced turn where the angle of bank is $\theta$ the lift acts at an angle $\theta$ away from the vertical. It is useful to resolve the lift into a vertical component and a horizontal component.

Newton's second law in the horizontal direction can be expressed mathematically as:

$$L\sin \theta = {mv^2\over r}$$

where:

$L$ is the lift acting on the aircraft
$\theta$ is the angle of bank of the aircraft
$m$ is the mass of the aircraft
$v$ is the true airspeed of the aircraft
$r$ is the radius of the turn

In straight level flight, lift is equal to the aircraft weight. In turning flight the lift exceeds the aircraft weight, and is equal to the weight of the aircraft ($g$) divided by the cosine of the angle of bank:

$$L = {mg\over{\cos \theta}}$$

where $g$ is the gravitational field strength.

The radius of the turn can now be calculated:

$$r = {v^2\over{g \tan \theta}}$$

This formula shows that the radius of turn is proportional to the square of the aircraft's true airspeed. With a higher airspeed the radius of turn is larger, and with a lower airspeed the radius is smaller.

This formula also shows that the radius of turn decreases with the angle of bank. With a higher angle of bank the radius of turn is smaller, and with a lower angle of bank the radius is greater.

In a banked turn at constant altitude, the load factor is equal to $\frac{1}{\cos\theta}$. We can see that the load factor in straight and level flight is $1$, since $\cos(0)=1$, and to generate sufficient lift to maintain constant altitude, the load factor must approach infinity as the bank angle approaches $90^\circ$ and $\cos\theta$ approaches $0$. This is physically impossible, because structural limitations of the aircraft or physical endurance of the occupants will be exceeded well before then.

=== In athletics ===
Most indoor track and field venues have banked turns since the tracks are smaller than outdoor tracks. The tight turns on these small tracks are usually banked to allow athletes to lean inward and neutralize the centrifugal force as they race around the curve; the lean is especially noticeable on sprint events.

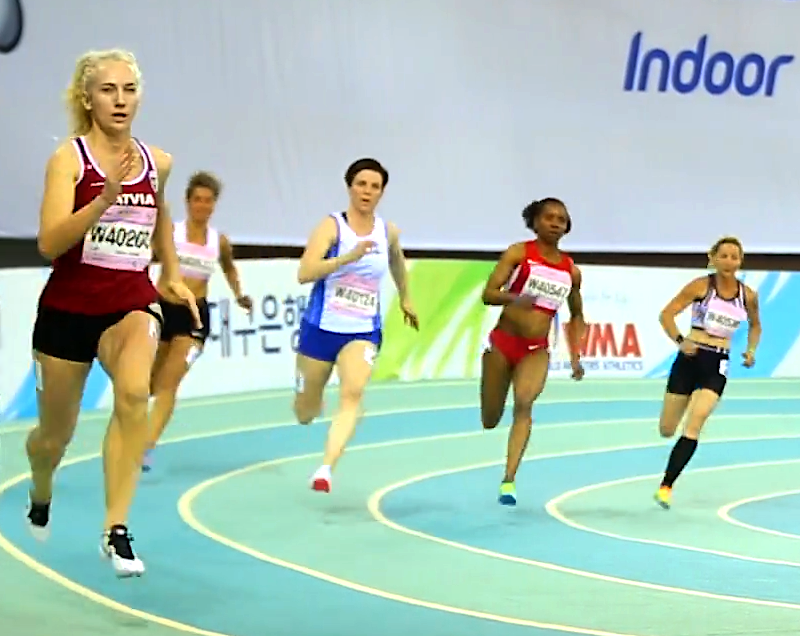
Sprinters leaning into a turn on a banked indoor track

== See also ==
- Camber angle
- Cant (road/rail)
- Coriolis force (perception)
- Centripetal force
- g-force
- Oval track racing
