= Jim Crow Creek (California) =

Coordinates: 39°33′06″N 120°46′51″W

Jim Crow Creek is a stream and a road east of Downieville in Sierra County, California, in the United States.

Jim Crow Creek was named after the nickname of a Kanaka (Pacific Island worker) in the California Gold Rush.

== See also ==
- List of rivers of California
