= Cant (road and rail) =

Rate of change in elevation between the two rails or edges of a road

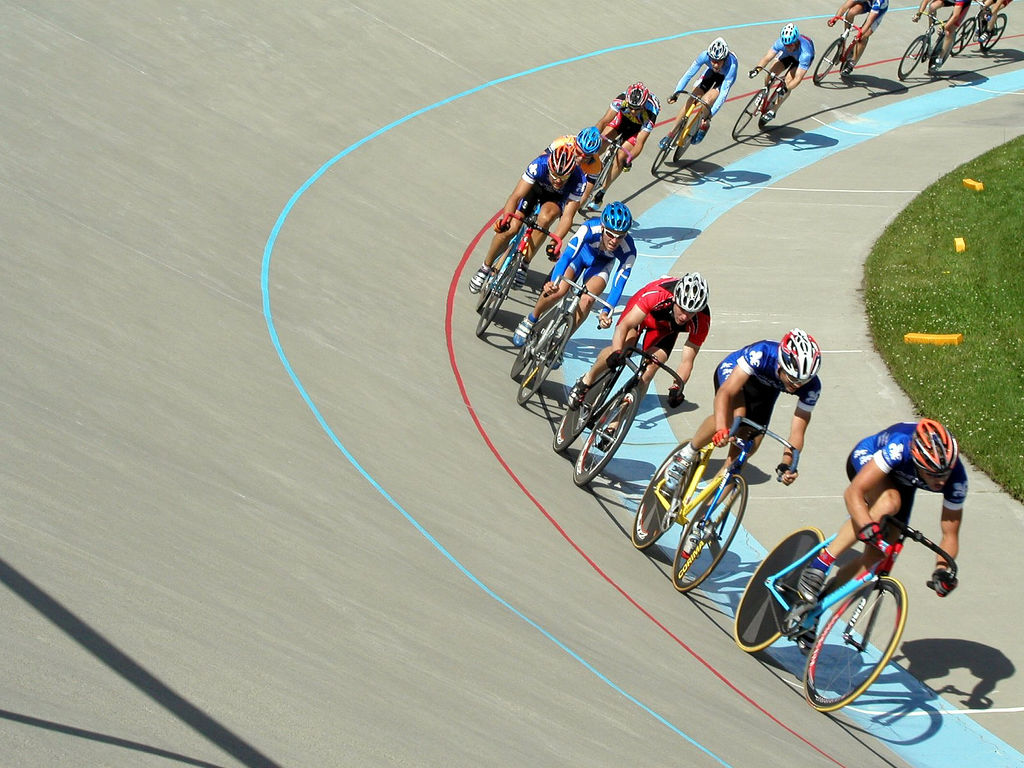
Cant in a velodrome

The cant of a railway track or camber of a road (also referred to as superelevation, cross slope, cross fall, or difference in crosslevel) is the difference in elevation (height) between the two rails or edges of the road. This is normally greater where the railway or road is curved; raising the outer rail or the outer edge of the road creates a banked turn, thus allowing vehicles to travel round the curve at greater speeds than would be possible if the surface were level.

== Rail ==
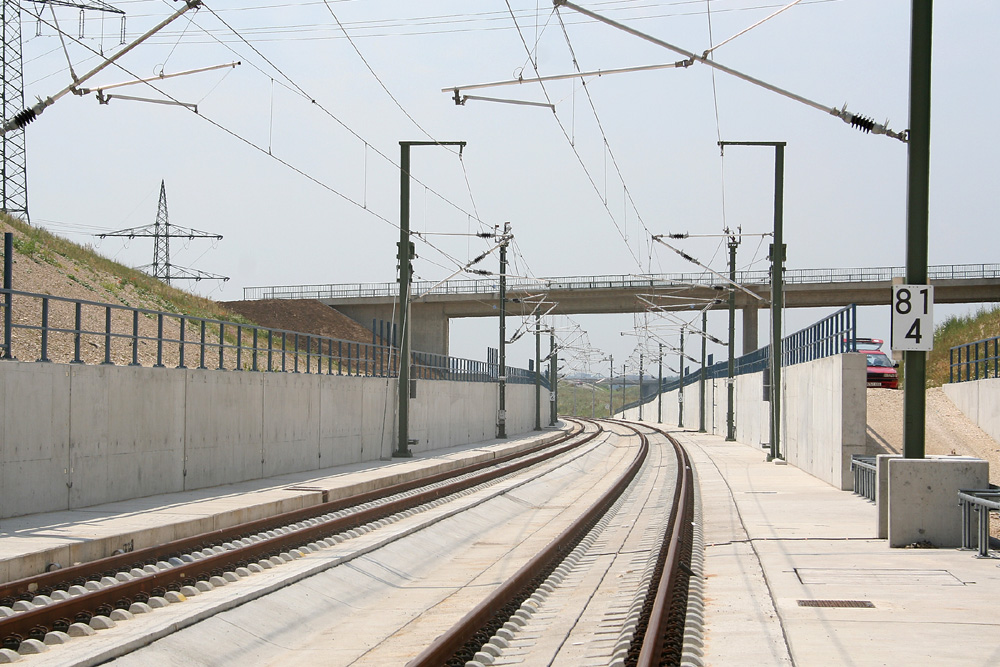
The cant in a curve of the Nuremberg–Ingolstadt line

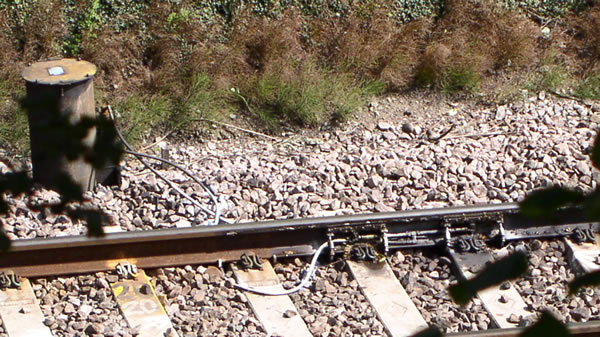
Track lubrication device on a reverse curve in an area prone to movement due to wet beds

=== Superelevation in railway tracks ===
Importance of superelevation

In curved railway tracks, the outer rail is elevated, providing a banked turn. This allows trains to navigate curves at higher speeds without risk of overturning and reduces the pressure of the wheel flanges against the rails, minimizing friction and wear. The difference in elevation between the outer and inner rails is referred to as cant.

The main functions of cant are to

- Improve distribution of the load across both rails
- Reduce wear on rails and wheels
- Neutralize the effect of lateral forces and the risk of overturning
- Improve passenger comfort and reduce the risk of passengers falling

The stability gained from using cant on curves prevents the wheel flanges from touching the rails, minimizing friction, wear, and rail squeal.

How superelevation works

On horizontal curves, curvature causes a train to experience centrifugal force acting outward on the outer wheel. The smaller the radius of curvature, the greater the centrifugal force for the same train speed. Raising the outer rail causes the plane of the tracks to lean towards the center of the curve. For a train on the superelevated track, this makes a component of the gravitation force act towards the center of the curve acting in opposition to the centrifugal force. This improves the distribution of the load across both rails, ensuring stability and safety for trains navigating the curve and improving passenger comfort. Because of the increased forces exerted in the curve, curved track often requires railroad ties (sleepers) at a closer spacing and a greater depth of ballast.

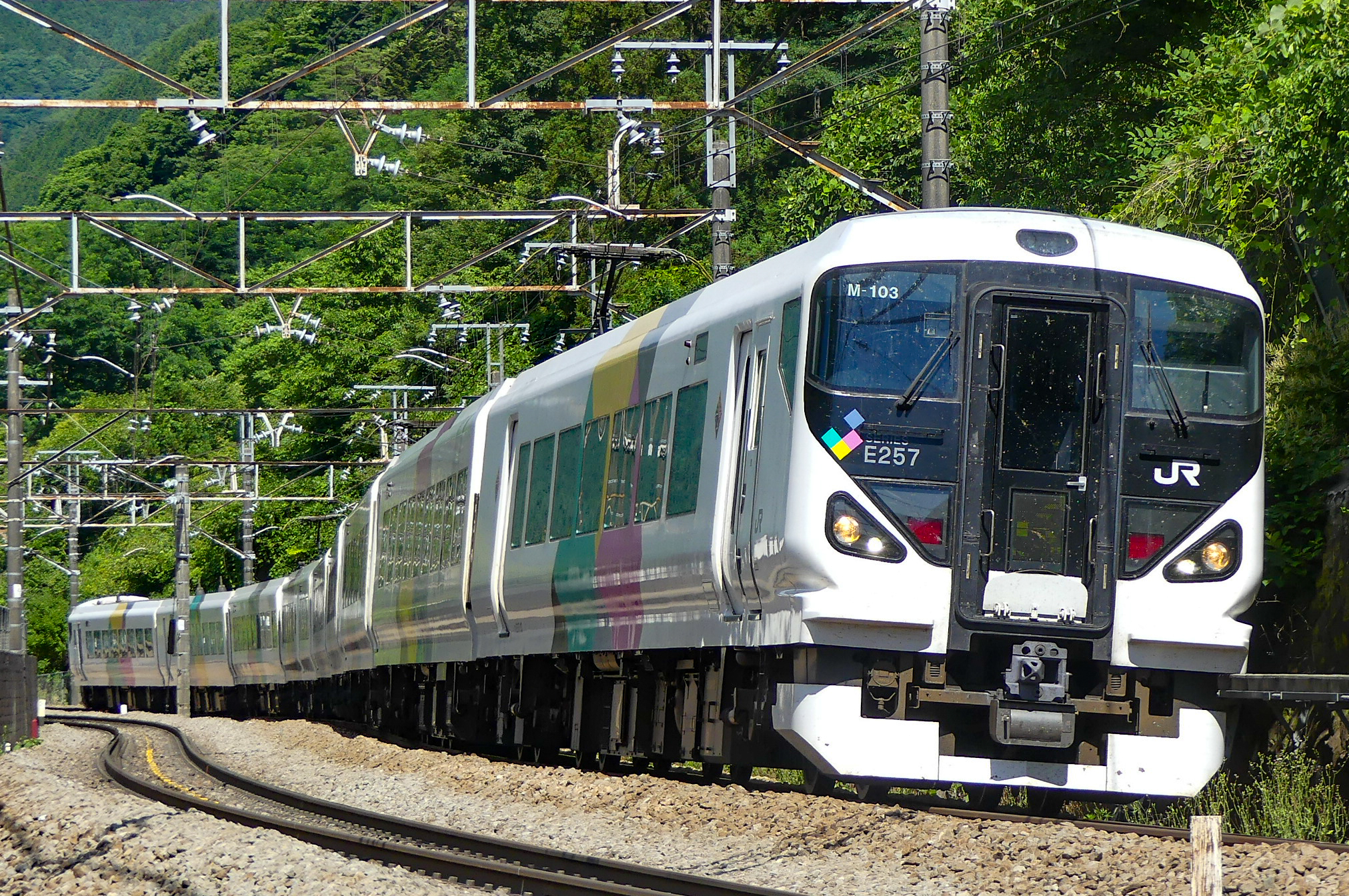
A Series 257 train on an S-curve in June 2018 showing the effect of railway superelevation

The necessary cant in a curve depends on the planned speed of the trains and the radius of curvature: the higher the speed, the greater the centrifugal force to mitigate. However, the curve may use a compromise value, for example if slow-moving trains may occasionally use tracks intended for high-speed trains.

Generally the aim is for trains to run without flange contact, which also depends on the tire profile of the wheels. Allowance has to be made for the different speeds of trains. Slower trains will tend to make flange contact with the inner rail on curves, while faster trains will tend to ride outwards and make contact with the outer rail. Either contact causes wear and tear and may lead to derailment. Many high-speed lines do not permit slower freight trains, particularly with heavier axle loads. In some cases, the impact is reduced by the use of flange lubrication.

For high-speed railways in Europe, maximum cant is 180 mm (7 in) when slow freight trains are not allowed. In the United States, the maximum cant allowed for the slowest track class is 8 in (203 mm) and the maximum cant allowed for all other track is 7 in (178 mm).

At the ends of a curve, where the rails straighten out, the amount of cant cannot change from zero to full elevation at a single point. It must change (ramp) gradually in a track transition curve. The length of the transition depends on the maximum allowable speed; the higher the speed, the greater the length required.

=== Application to maximum permitted speed ===
Cant, along with curve radius, are fundamental parameters governing the maximum speed for trains negotiating curves. To compute the maximum speed a train may travel in a curve, start by considering the ideal situation where the train travels at a perfect balance speed, given by the banked turn formula

$$v= \sqrt{rg\tan \theta},$$

where $r$ denotes the radius of the curve, $g$ the acceleration due to gravity, and $\theta$ the cant angle. The interpretation of $\tan \theta$ is the ratio of the superelevation of the outer rail (opposite the angle) over the distance between the rails (adjacent the angle) as measured in the horizontal plane.

For simplicity in practical applications, since the gage of the railway is roughly constant the term $\tan \theta$ can be approximated with $\sin \theta$. The interpretation of $\sin \theta$ is the ratio of the superelevation over the distance between the tracks as measured in the plane of the tracks (hypotenuse). Using the hypotenuse means the formula, when written algebraically, only requires track inspectors to take a single measurement (the superelevation). When the cant angle is 0° this approximation is exact. As the angle grows, this approximation causes an underestimate of the allowed speed. For example, for a cant angle of 15°, which roughly corresponds to 6" superelevation plus 9" of unbalanced elevation, using this approximation underestimates the allowed speed by 1.72%.

Plugging in the approximation, the allowed speed formula becomes

$$v= \sqrt{rg\sin \theta}.$$

Further considering the definition of $\sin \theta$ and letting $E$ denote the superelevation of the outer track and $w$ the distance between the measured points in the plane of the tracks, the formula becomes

$$v = \sqrt{rg \frac{E}{w}}.$$

Traditionally, railway curvature is measured in degrees of curvature of 100-foot chords rather than radius because of its practical usefulness in railway construction. In this system, the degree of curvature of a railway curve is measured by the angle a 100 foot rope held on the curve produces as viewed from the center of the curve. Equivalently, the degree of curvature is the change in bearing of sequential 100 foot chords along the curve. See the chord definition of degree of curvature.

In exact terms, the relation between radius and degrees of curvature is then

$$r = \frac{100}{2 \sin \left( \frac{d}{2} \frac{\pi}{180} \right) },$$

with $d$ the degree of curvature and a conversion factor to radians included.

Since the degree of curvature is usually small (less than 12°), this relationship can be simplified by a linear approximation of the $\sin$ function, yielding

$$r = \frac{100}{2 \sin \left( \frac{d}{2} \frac{\pi}{180} \right) } \approx \frac{100}{d} \frac{180}{\pi}.$$

This approximation of the radius asymptotically converges to the exact value as the degree of curvature tends to zero (or as the radius grows towards infinity) but it underestimates when the degree of curvature is large (radius is small). For example, for a tight 12° curve (radius 478 feet) using this approximation underestimates the allowed speed by 0.091%.

Plugging in the approximation for the radius, the allowed speed formula becomes

$$v= \sqrt{g \frac{E}{w} \frac{100}{d} \frac{180}{\pi}}.$$

In considering the width of measurement $w$, the superelevation is measured by subtracting the relative difference in height between the top surface (tread) of the inside rail from the tread of the outside rail. This means the width of measurement is larger than the gage of the track, which is the distance between the insides of the rails. The width is therefore roughly the gage of the track plus the width of a rail. With non-excepted track in the US having permitted actual gage between 56" and 58", selecting middle value 57" plus a 3" wide rail gives a width of measurement of 60 inches.

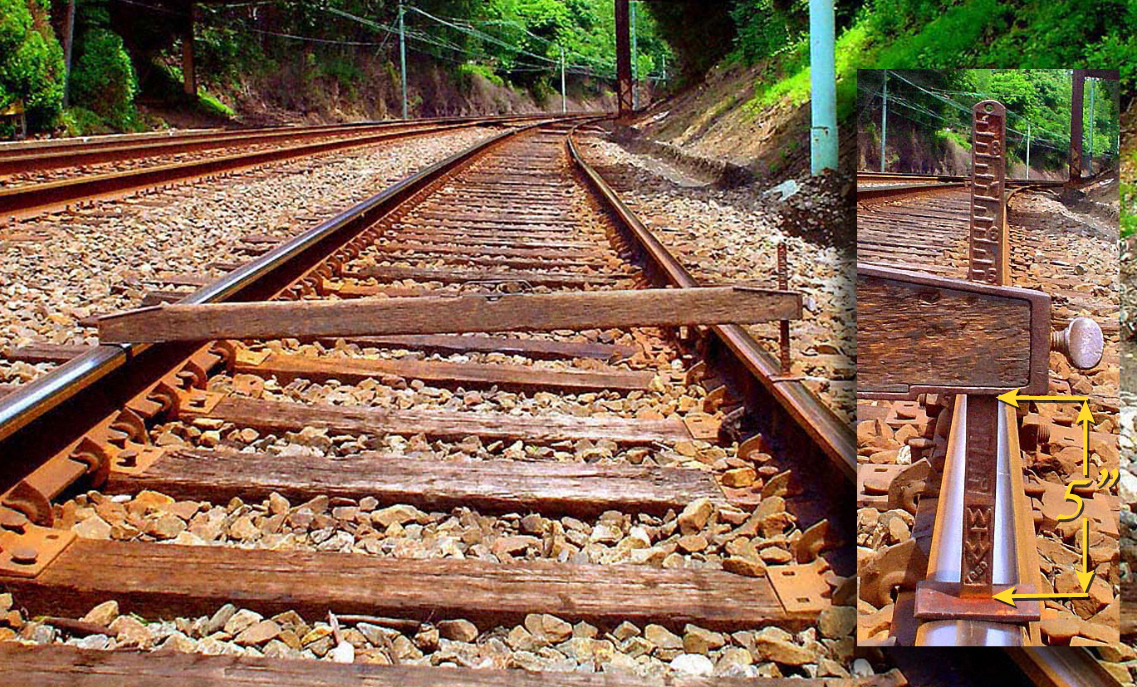
Superelevation is measured from the top surface of the low rail to the top surface of the high rail, resulting in a measurement width larger than the gage of the track, which is the distance between the insides of the rails.

Finally, substituting the acceleration due to gravity of $g=32.17\,\mathrm{ft/s^2}$ and adding the customary unit conversion from $\mathrm{ft/s}$ to mph yields

$$v = \frac{3600}{5280} \sqrt{32.17 \frac{E}{60} \frac{100}{d} \frac{180}{\pi}}
\approx \sqrt{ \frac{E} {0.0007002 d}}.$$

Typically the speed of a train is not determined by the balance speed of the actual track superelevation but by the balance speed at an imaginary amount of superelevation $E = E_a + E_u$ where $E_a$ is the actual superelevation of the track and $E_u$ is a vehicle-dependent quantity called the unbalanced elevation or cant deficiency. $E_u$ provides a measure for the extent to which a rail vehicle can take a turn above the natural balance speed while maintaining safety standards. Values for $E_u$ are commonly 1-2 inches for freight cars, 3 inches a default for untested passenger vehicles or any other vehicles, and 5 inches and above for high-speed passenger vehicles. As of 1998, the largest value of $E_u$ ever allowed by the Federal Railroad Administration was 9 inches for revenue service and 12 inches for testing qualified equipment..

Making this substitution and rounding the numerical constant yields the official maximum speed formula used in the United States of

$$V_{\max} = \sqrt{\frac{E_a + E_u}{0.0007D}}.$$

=== Examples ===
In Australia, the Australian Rail Track Corporation is increasing speed around curves sharper than an 800-metre (2,625 ft) radius by replacing wooden sleepers with concrete ones so that the cant can be increased.

=== Rail cant ===
The rails themselves are now usually canted inwards by about 5 to 10 percent.

In 1925 about 15 of 36 major American railways had adopted this practice.

== Roads ==
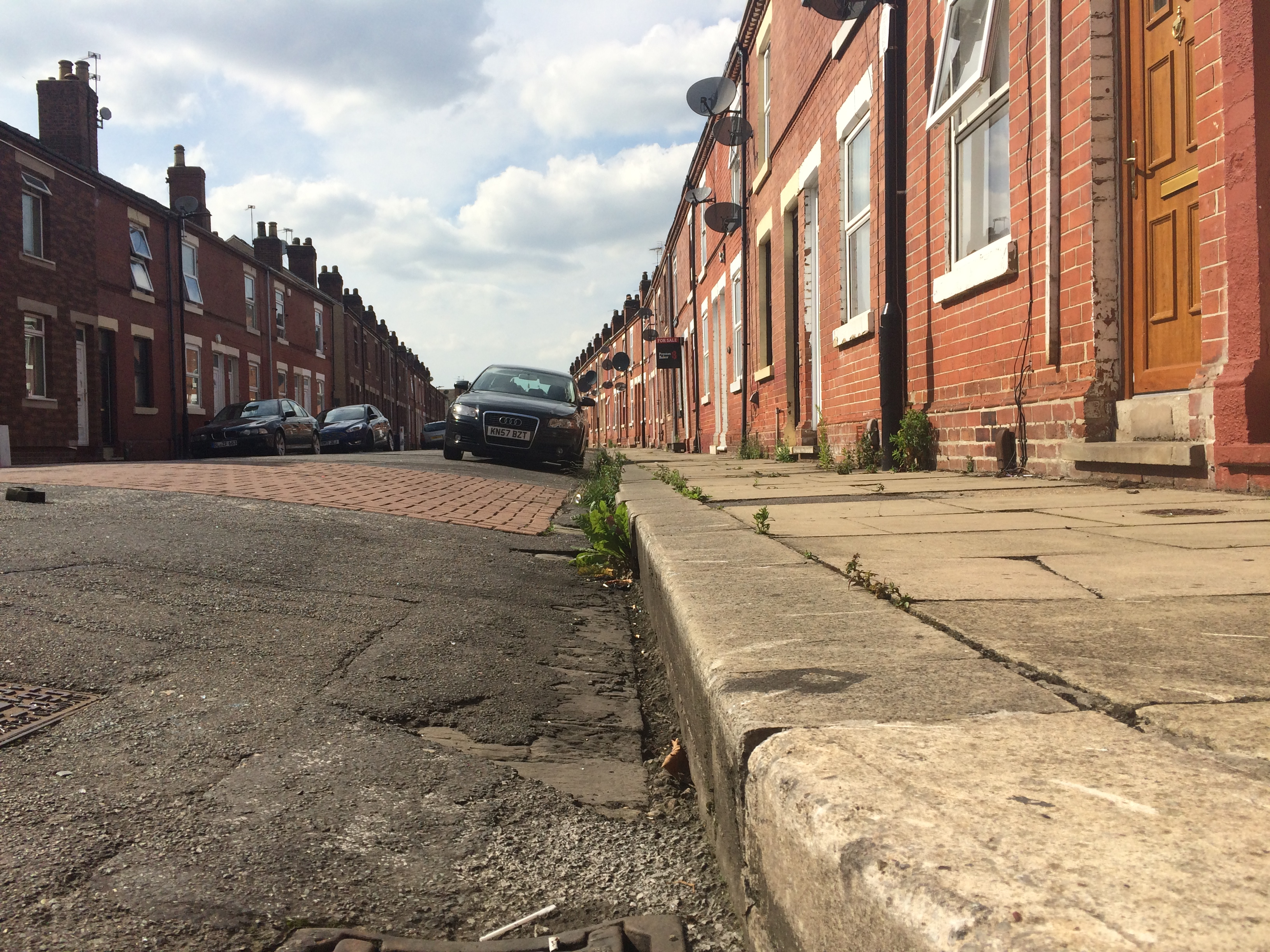
Steeper cants or cambers are common on residential streets, allowing water to drain into the gutter.

In civil engineering, cant is often referred to as cross slope or camber. It helps rainwater drain from the road surface. Along straight or gently curved sections, the middle of the road is normally higher than the edges. This is called "normal crown" and helps shed rainwater off the sides of the road. During road works that involve lengths of temporary carriageway, the slope may be the opposite to normal – for example, with the outer edge higher – which causes vehicles to lean towards oncoming traffic. In the UK, this is indicated on warning signs as "adverse camber".

On more severe bends, the outside edge of the curve is raised, or superelevated, to help vehicles around the curve. The amount of superelevation increases with its design speed and with curve sharpness.

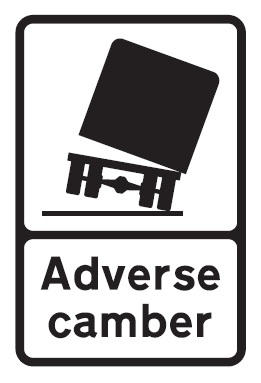
Off-camber bend to the left (UK road sign)

=== Off-camber ===
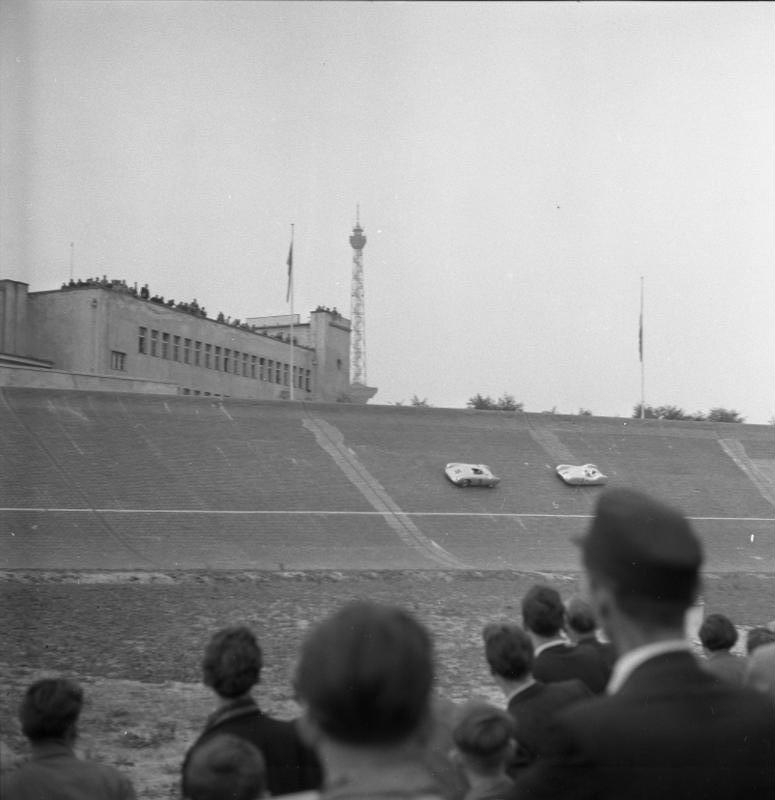
The AVUS race track in Berlin featured 43 degrees of camber on its north corner until the 1960s.

An off-camber corner is lower on the outside of a turn than on the inside, and is described as the opposite of a banked turn, or as a negative-bank turn. Off-camber corners are both feared and celebrated by skilled drivers. Handling them is a major factor in skilled vehicle control, both single-track and automotive; both engine-powered and human-powered vehicles; both on and off closed courses; and both on and off paved surfaces.

On race courses, they are one of a handful of engineering factors at the disposal of a course designer in order to challenge and test drivers' skills. Off-camber corners were described by a training guide for prospective racers as "the hardest corners you will encounter" on the track. Many notable courses such as Riverside International Raceway combine off-camber corners with elevation and link corners for extra driver challenge.

On the street, they are a feature of some of the world's most celebrated paved roads, such as The "Dragon" (US 129) through Deals Gap and the "Diamondback" (NC 226A) in North Carolina, Route 78 in Ohio, Route 125 in Pennsylvania, Route 33 in California, and Betws-y-Coed Triangle in Snowdonia National Park in Wales.

To mountain bikers and motorcyclists on trails and dirt tracks, off-camber corners are also challenging, and can be either an engineered course feature, or a natural feature of single-track trails. In cyclocross, off-camber sections are common as the courses snake around ridges, adding difficulty.

Camber in virtual race circuits is carefully controlled by video game race simulators to achieve the designer's desired level of difficulty.

== See also ==
- Banked turn
- Camber angle
- Profilograph
- Tilting train
