= Train noise =

Vehicle noise made by trains

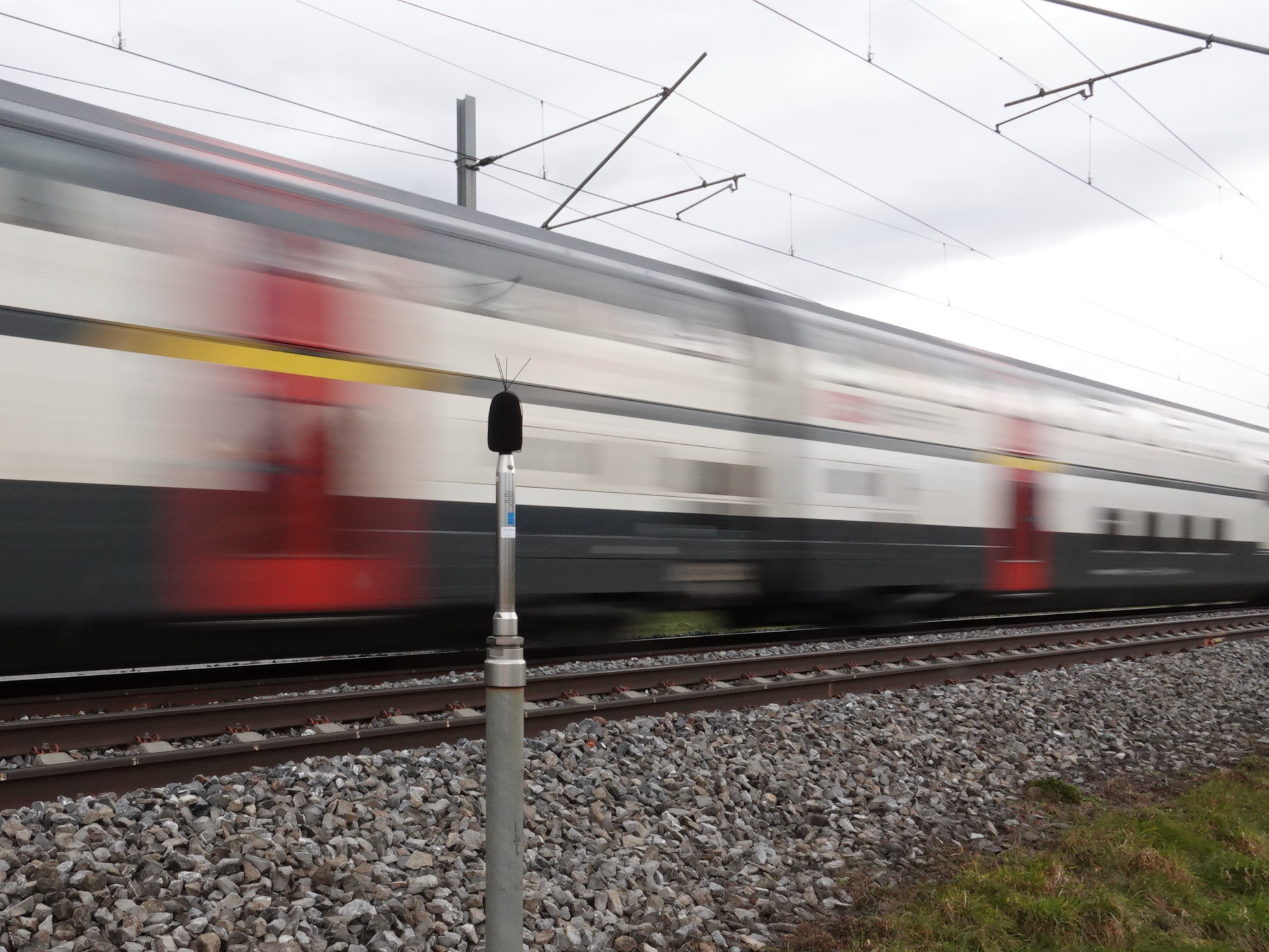
Pass-by noise of a passenger train is measured in Switzerland.

Train noise is vehicle noise made by trains. Noises may be heard inside the train and outside.

Subway systems, light rail transit and freight trains can send loud train noise into neighborhoods. Organizations such as the World Health Organization and the U.S. Environmental Protection Agency have set guidelines for noise level decibel limits for rapid transit. Noise levels can be reduced by installing noise barriers next to the track. Traditional clickety-clack sounds occur as a result of gaps in the rail to allow for thermal expansion. On most railways, the gaps are opposite each other and if the carriages are about the same length as the rails, an even clickety clack sound is generated. In the USA the rail joints are staggered, so not being opposite each other, a different and irregular sound is heard.

== Sources ==
Example of magnetic noise coming from a subway electric motor

Several distinct sounds are created by various parts of the train, such as engines, traction motors, brakes, and the wheels rolling on the rails.

- Roughness and irregularities on the wheel and rail surfaces are a source of noise and vibration. Rail joints and squats on the rail cause a familiar "clickety-clack" sound as train wheels roll over them. Rail corrugation (a periodic wear pattern resembling corrugated metal) causes tonal noise and vibration; fine, short-wavelength corrugation is known as "roaring rails" due to its high-pitched sound, whereas coarse, long-wavelength corrugation can cause the ground and nearby buildings to vibrate. Rail roughness and corrugation are treated by grinding the rails. This reduces noise in problem areas although trains make a distinctive tonal sound on freshly-ground track due to the pattern on the rail left by the grinding process, which wears flat over time.
- Rail squeal is a sound caused by a train's wheels slipping under specific conditions, usually around sharp curves.
- Air displacement of a train in a tunnel can create noise from turbulence.
- Trains also use horns, whistles, bells, and other noise-making devices for both communications and warnings.
- The engines in diesel locomotives and DMUs produce significant amounts of noise. Newer locomotives have become much quieter in recent years due to noise regulations being implemented by countries and regions. However, there are still times that a locomotive may develop a defect in its turbocharger, which produces a whine that can be heard for many kilometres. While this is rare, and usually the said locomotive gets put into the shop quickly, the noise has been compared to an air raid siren, or a very large leaf blower. It appears to be the most common on units built by EMD (Caterpillar's locomotive division) equipped with the 710 series prime mover, although any turbocharged locomotive may develop this problem.
- Electric traction motors often produce electromagnetically induced noise. This high-pitch noise depends on the speed and torque level of the machine, as well as the motor type. Variable-frequency drives use pulse-width modulation, which introduces additional current harmonics and results in higher acoustic noise. The switching frequency of the PWM can be asynchronous (independent of speed) or synchronous (proportional to speed), but always results in acoustic noise varying with speed.

=== Rail squeal ===
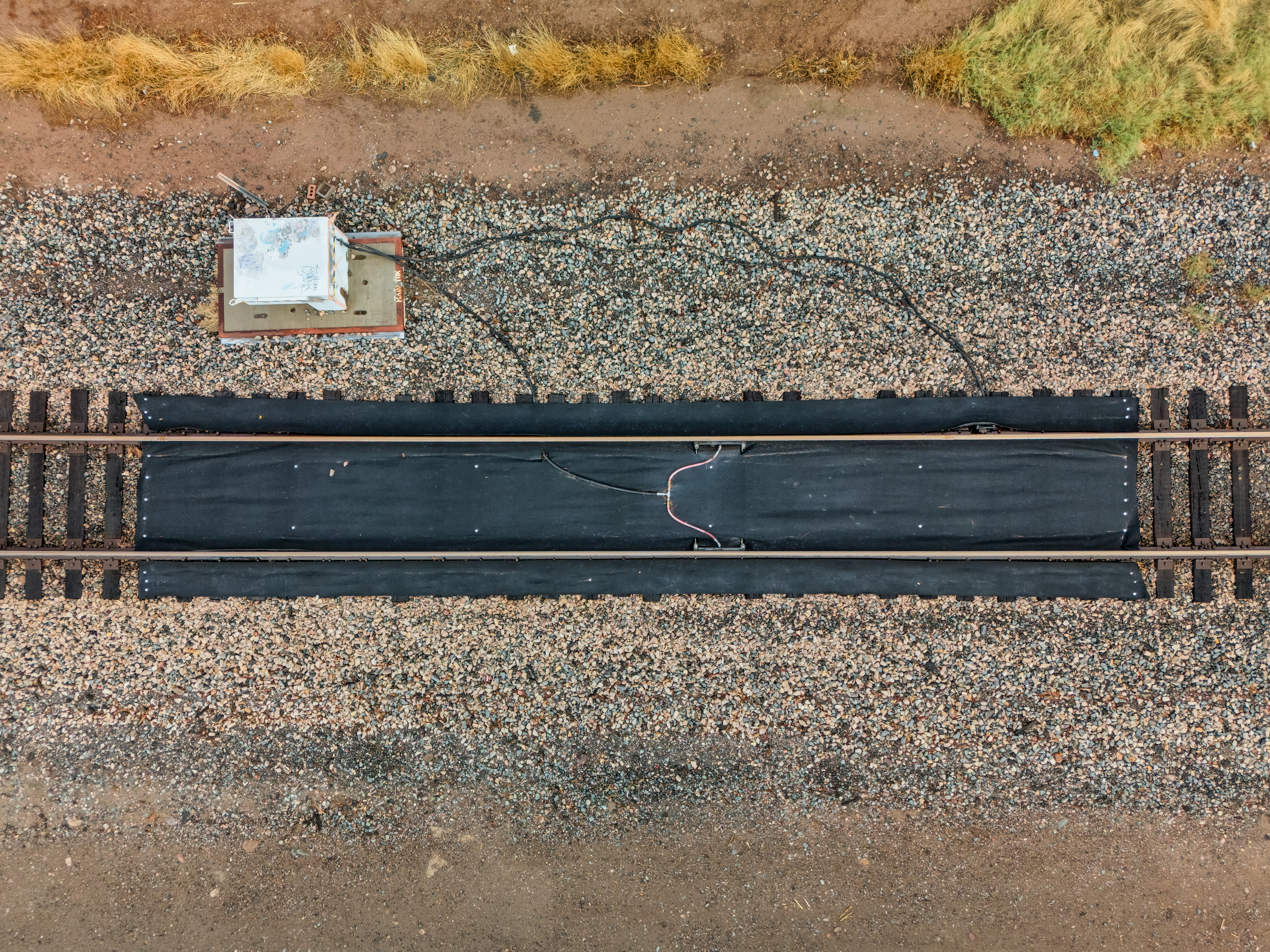
Top-down view of a Union Pacific rail curve lubrication system in the US

Rail squeal is a screeching train-track friction sound, commonly occurring on sharp curves. Squeal is caused by the flanges of the wheels scraping across the railhead. The "Howling sound" is caused by lateral sticking and slipping of the wheels across top of the railroad track. This results in vibrations in the wheel that increase until a stable amplitude is reached. Lubricating the rails has limited success. Speed reduction also appears to reduce noise levels.

The sticking of the rim of the wheel causes the wheel to ring like a bell, so rubber dampers or tuned absorbers are a possible solution to lower the volume. The MBTA Green Line, for example, suffers from severe rail squeal on the sharp curves within the central subway. Flange stick graphite lubricators have been installed on trains to attempt to mitigate the rail squeal issue. The mechanism that causes the squealing also is the cause of wear and tear that happens in the wheel–rail interface.

Factors affecting rail squeal include:

- Accelerating, coasting or braking
- Diameter of wheel
- Powered or unpowered wheels
- Radius of curve
- Rail lubrication
- Slant of rail (typically 1 in 20)
- Superelevation or cant
- Type of train
- Weather (rails wet or dry) (slippery rail)
- Wheelbase
- Worn profile of wheel
- Worn profile of rail

== See also ==
- Active noise control
- Adhesion railway
- Brake squeal
- Noise health effects
- Roadway noise
- Environmental noise

== Bibliography ==
- Thompson, D.J. (2008). Railway Noise and Vibration. Elsevier Science. ISBN 9780080451473.
