= Train wheel =

Wheel designed for railway tracks

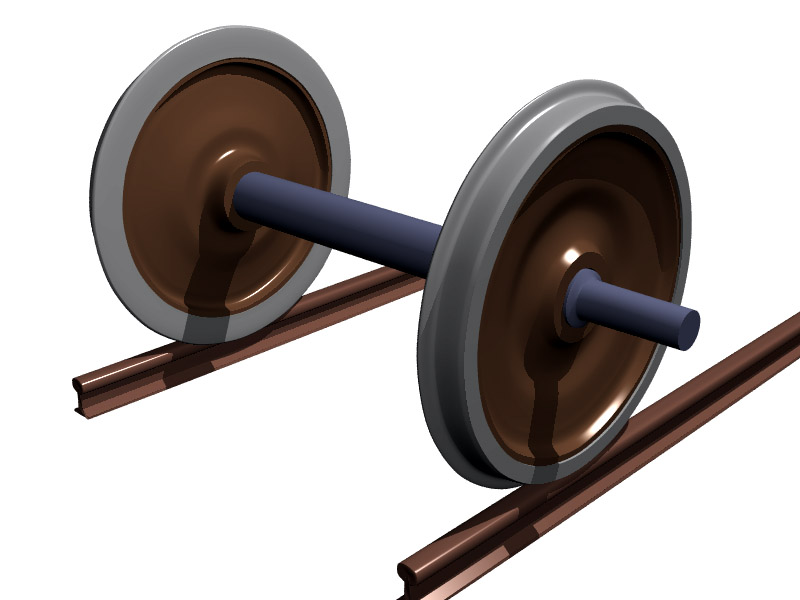
Both wheels of a wheelset rotate at the same rate because the wheels are fixed rigidly on the axle

A train wheel or rail wheel is a type of wheel specially designed for use on railway tracks. The wheel acts as a rolling component, typically press fitted on to an axle and mounted directly on a railway carriage or locomotive, or indirectly on a bogie (CwthE) or truck (NAmE). The powered wheels under the locomotive are called driving wheels. Wheels are initially cast or forged and then heat-treated to have a specific hardness. New wheels are machined using a lathe to a standardised shape, called a profile. All wheel profiles are regularly checked to ensure proper interaction between the wheel and the rail. Incorrectly profiled wheels and worn wheels can increase rolling resistance, reduce energy efficiency and may even cause a derailment. The International Union of Railways has defined a standard wheel diameter of 920 mm (36 in), although smaller sizes are used in some rapid transit railway systems and on ro-ro carriages.

== Wheel geometry and flange ==
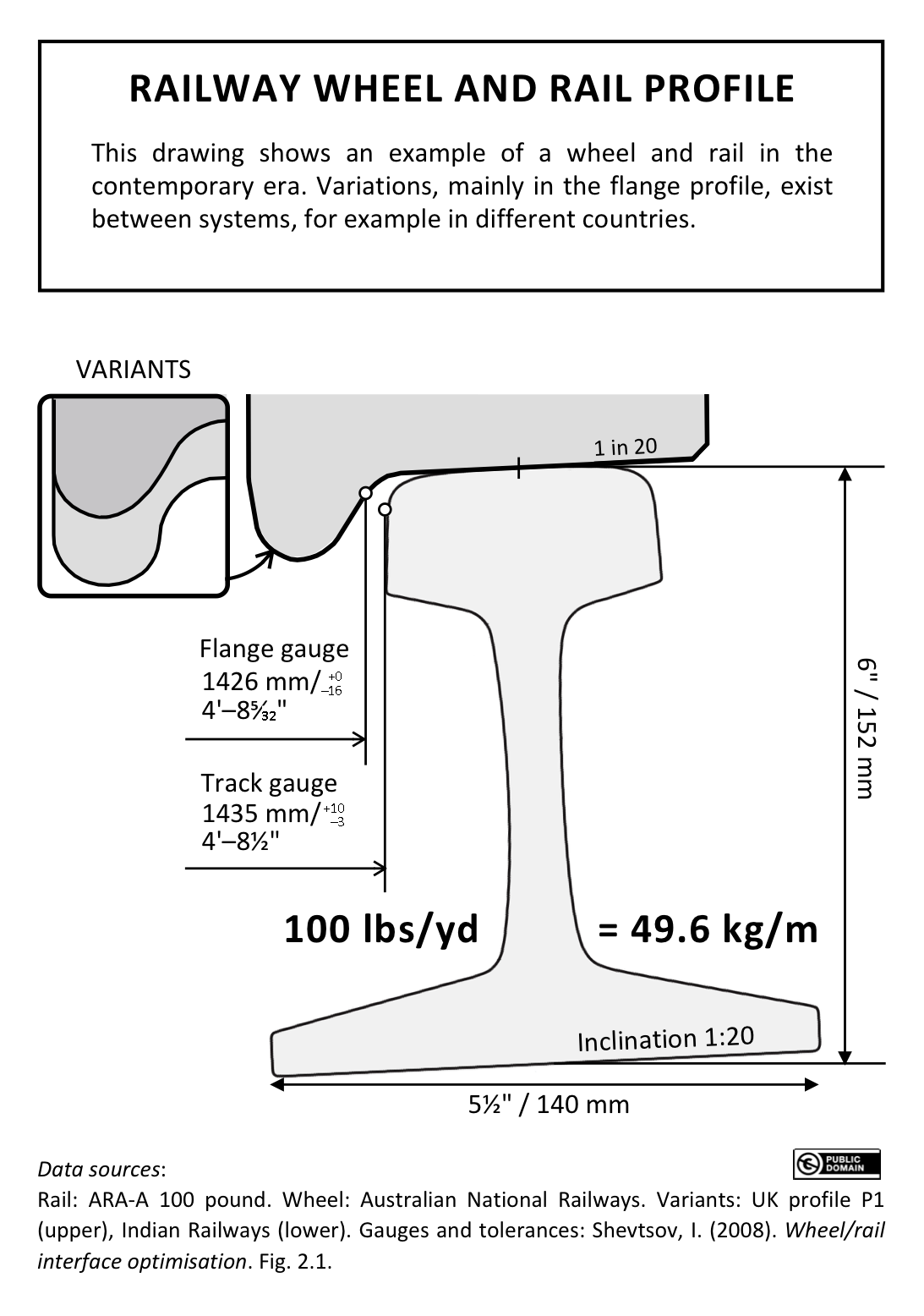
A railway wheel's tread and flange and its relationship to the load-bearing rail

The running surface ("tread" or "rim") of most train wheels is conical, which serves as the primary means of keeping the train aligned centrally on the track while in motion. On curves, the wheelset becomes "self-steering" because of this coning: when one wheel is pushed closer to the adjacent (outer) rail, it presents a bigger circumference to the rail than when centred on the track. Simultaneously, the inner wheel presents a smaller circumference to its rail. The difference between the distances travelled by each wheel for each rotation of the axle causes the wheelset to follow the curve of the track. If a strong sideways force is experienced – for example, when the radius of a curve is smaller than normal or there are defects in the track alignment – the wheelset will depart from its equilibrium. That is when a projection on the inner side of each wheel, called a flange, constrains the wheelset from moving further and derailing.

As the wheel wears out, its geometry may change and present irregularities, causing vibrations which can cause damage or discomfort and if severe, present a derailment risk. To correct this without requiring a new wheel, wheel reprofiling is carried out, in which material is removed from the wheel via turning or milling to restore it to its correct geometry, reducing its diameter. Once the wheel meets its minimum allowed diameter, it cannot be reprofiled again and must be replaced.

== Wheel arrangement ==
The number of wheels per locomotive or car varies in both size and number to accommodate the needs of the vehicle. Regardless of these factors, pairs of identically sized wheels are always affixed to a straight axle as a singular unit, called a wheelset.

== Wheels for road–rail vehicles ==
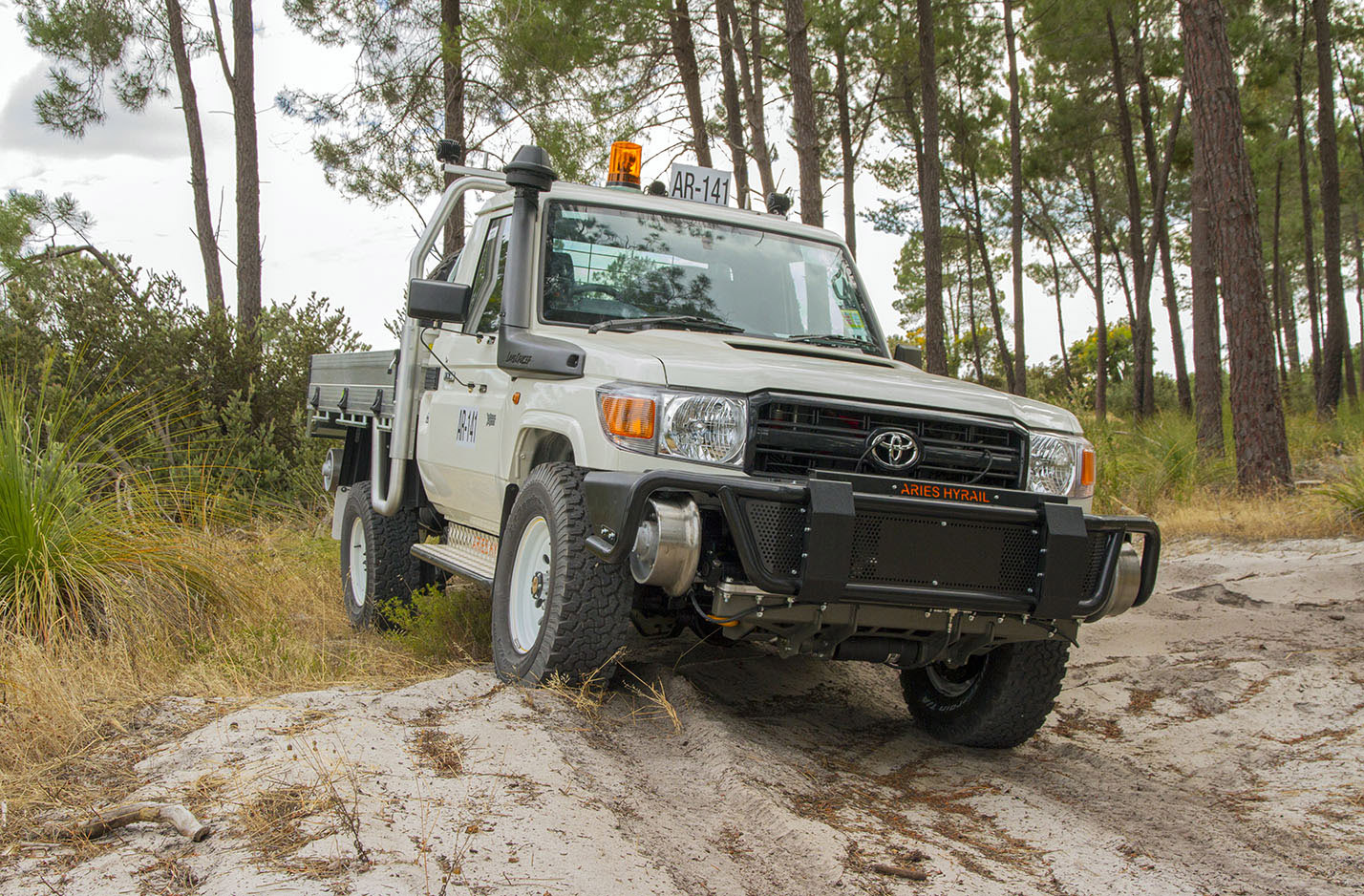
The small rail wheels fitted to road–rail vehicles allow them to be stowed away when the vehicle is in road-going mode.

Wheels used for road–rail vehicles are normally smaller than those found on other types of rolling stock, such as locomotives or carriages, because the wheel has to be stowed clear of the ground when the vehicle is in road-going mode. Such wheels can be as small as 245 mm (9.65 in) in diameter.

== Railway wheel and tire ==
Modern railway wheels are usually machined from a single casting, also known as monobloc wheels. Some wheels, however, are made of two parts: the wheel core, and a tyre (CwthE) or tire (NAmE) around the perimeter. Separate tyres have been a component of some rolling stock, their purpose being to provide a replaceable wearing element – an important factor in the steam locomotive era with their costly spoked construction. In modern times the tyre is invariably made from steel, which is stronger than the cast iron of earlier eras. It is typically heated and pressed on to the wheel before it cools and shrinks. Resilient rail wheels have a resilient material, such as rubber, between the wheel and tyre. Failure of this type of wheel was one of the causes leading to the Eschede high-speed train crash.

== Causes of damage ==
The most common cause of wheel damage is severe braking, including sudden braking, braking on steep gradients and braking with heavy loads. The brake shoes (or brake blocks) are applied directly to the wheel surface, which generates immense amounts of thermal energy: under normal operation, a wheel may reach a tread temperature of 550 °C (1,022 °F). Under severe braking conditions, the generated thermal energy can contribute to thermal shock or alteration of the wheel's mechanical properties. Ultimately, acute thermal loading leads to a phenomenon called spalling. Alternatively, severe braking or low adhesion may stop the rotation of the wheels while the vehicle is still moving, which may cause a flat spot on the wheel-rail interface and localised heat damage.

Modern railway wheels are manufactured reasonably thickly to provide an allowance of wear material, since worn wheel profiles or wheels with a flat spot can be machined on a wheel lathe if there is sufficient thickness of material remaining.

== Guide wheel ==
Rubber-tyred metros with a central guide rail, such as the Busan Metro, Lille Metro and the Sapporo Municipal Subway as well as rubber-tyred trams have guide wheels.

Left: diagram of the Translohr guide rail (green) and the tram's guide wheels (red). Right: cross section of the guide rail and guide wheel of the Bombardier's GLT

== See also ==
- Adhesive weight
- Cycloid and trochoid
- Wheelset (rail transport)#Conical wheel-tread
