= Tonti, Illinois =

- Unincorporated community
- Location within Illinois Location within the United States
- Coordinates: 38°39′53″N 88°58′42″W
- Country: United States
- State: Illinois
- County: Marion
- Elevation: 577 ft (176 m)
- Time zone: UTC-6 (CST)
  - Summer (DST): UTC-5 (CDT)
- GNIS ID: 423249

Tonti is an unincorporated community in Tonti Township, Marion County, Illinois, United States. The community of Tonti is now little more than a bend in the road and a sign, near where the Illinois Central Railroad tracks cross Interstate 57.

== History ==
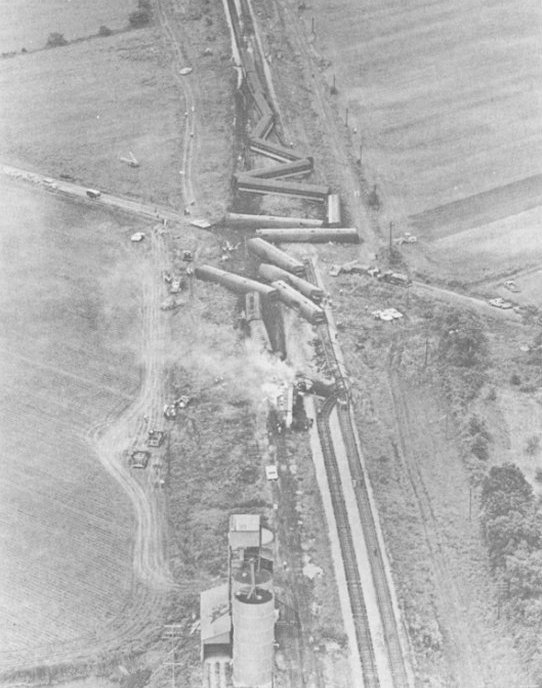
Photo of the Tonti derailment

The community of Tonti was named in honor of Henri de Tonti, an early Italian/French explorer of Illinois.

On June 10, 1971, Tonti was the site of the 1971 Salem, Illinois, derailment which was a derailment of Amtrak's City of New Orleans passenger train. It is sometimes referred to as the Tonti derailment. An investigation by the National Transportation Safety Board (NTSB) found that the derailment was caused by a false flange on a flat wheel caused by a seized axle bearing. The crash killed 10 people and injured 163. It was Amtrak's first train crash.
