= Wheelset (rail transport) =

Pair of railroad wheels fixed on to an axle

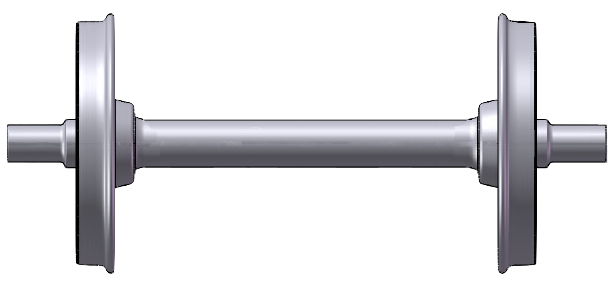
A rail vehicle wheelset, comprising two wheels mounted rigidly on an axle

A wheelset is a pair of railroad vehicle wheels mounted rigidly on an axle. Wheelsets are often mounted in a bogie ("truck" in North America) – a pivoted frame assembly holding at least two wheelsets – at each end of the vehicle. Most modern freight cars and passenger cars have bogies each with two wheelsets, but three wheelsets (or more) are used in bogies of freight cars that carry heavy loads, and three-wheelset bogies are under some passenger cars. Four-wheeled goods wagons that were once near-universal in Europe and Great Britain and their colonies have only two wheelsets; in recent decades such vehicles have become less common as trainloads have become heavier.

== Conical wheel-tread ==
Most train wheels have a conical taper of about 1 in 20 to enable the wheelset to follow curves with less chance of the wheel flanges coming in contact with the rail sides, and to reduce curve resistance. The rails generally slant inwards at 1 in 40, a lesser angle than the wheel cone. Without the conical shape, a wheel would tend to continue in a straight path due to the inertia of the rail vehicle, causing the wheelset to move towards the outer rail on the curve. The cone increases the effective diameter of the wheel as it moves towards the outer rail, and since the wheels are mounted rigidly on the axle, the outer wheels travel slightly farther, causing the wheelsets to more efficiently follow the curve. Abnormal wear at the wheel–rail interface is thus avoided, along with the loud, piercing, very high-pitched squeal which usually results from it – especially evident on curves in tunnels, stations and elevated track, due to flat surfaces slipping and flanges grinding along the rail. However, if the degree of conicality is inappropriate for the suspension and track, an unpleasant oscillation can occur at high speeds. Recent research is also showing that marginal changes to wheel and rail profiles can improve performance further.

Not all railroads have employed conical-tread wheels. The Bay Area Rapid Transit (BART) system in San Francisco, built with cylindrical wheels and flat-topped rails, started to re-profile the wheels in 2016 with conical treads after years of complaints about the squeal by its passengers. Australia's Queensland Railways used cylindrical wheels and vertical rails until the mid-1980s, when considerably higher train loads made the practice untenable.

== Specialised wheelsets ==
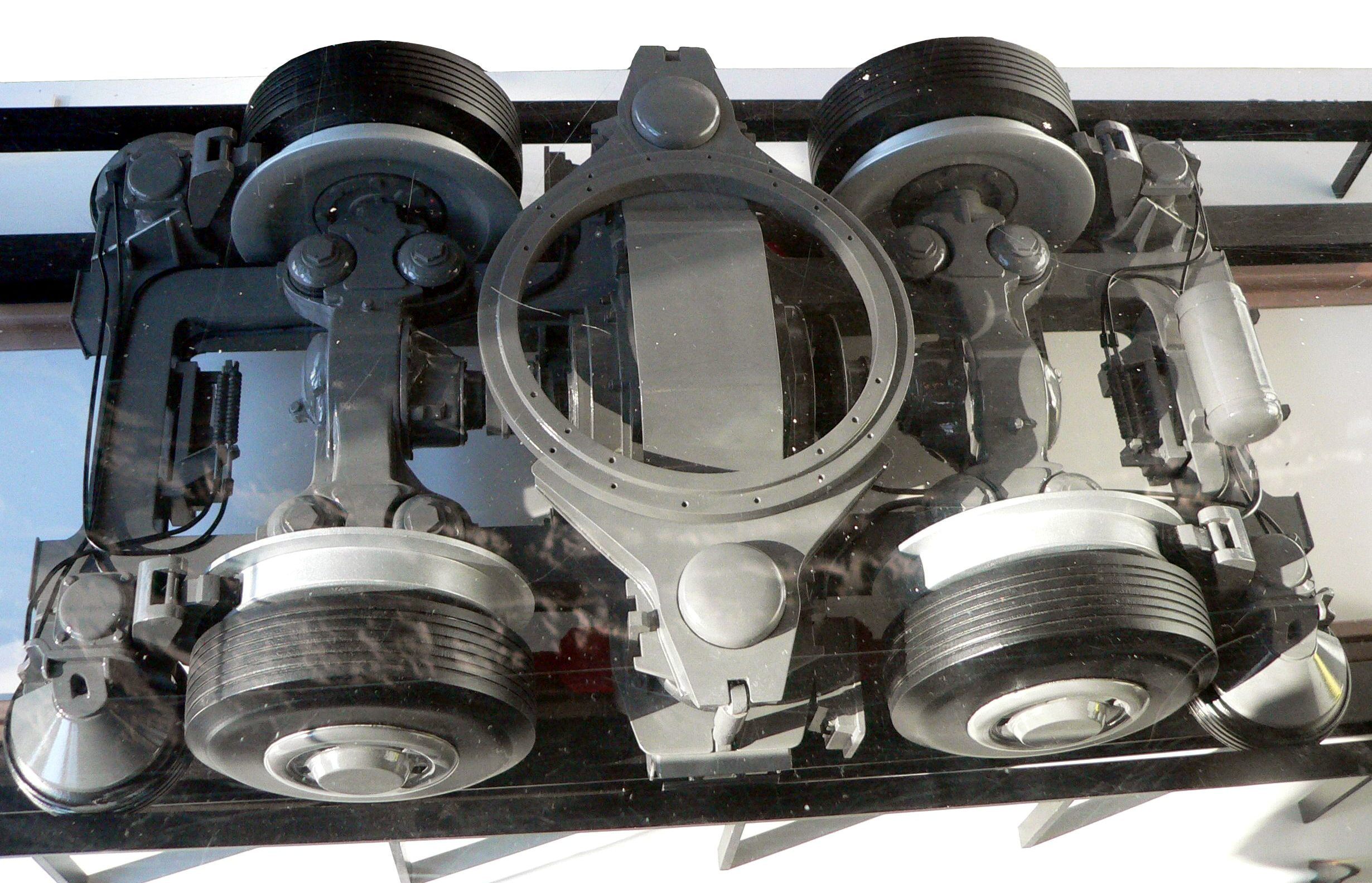
Bogie of a rubber-tyred electric multiple unit of the Paris Métro

Translohr twin wheelet. 1: Pavement. 2: Gap (empty space). 3: Guide rail. 4: Resin. 5: Flange. 6: Spring. 7: Tyre.

Some rubber-tyred metros feature special wheelsets with rubber tyres outside of deep-flanged steel wheels, which guide the bogie through standard railroad switches and keep the train from derailing if a tyre deflates. The system was originally conceived by Michelin for the Paris Métro; the first line opened in 1956.

== Gallery ==
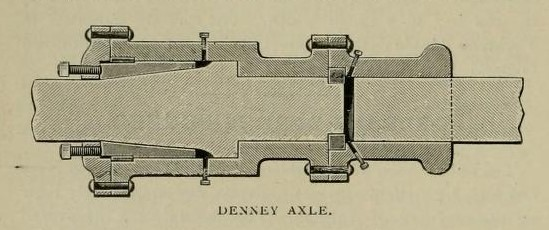
Denney axle

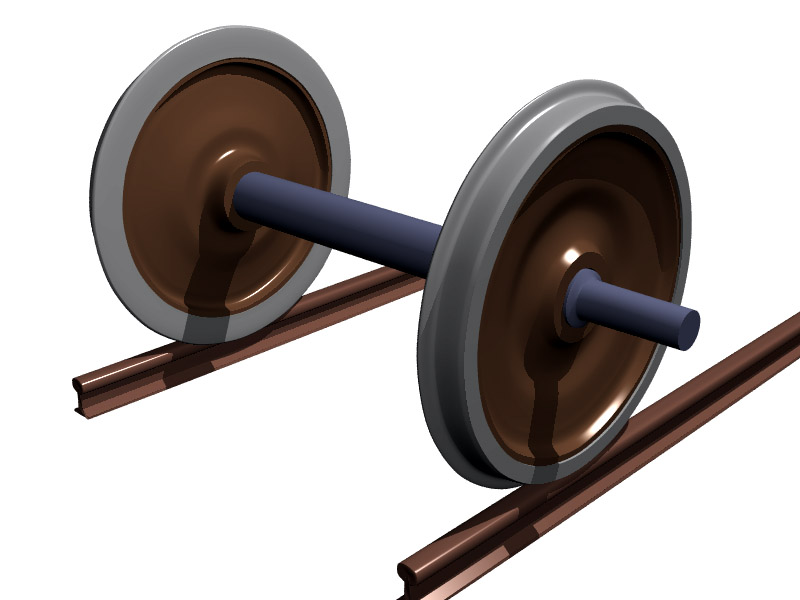
Railroad car wheels are rigidly mounted on an axle to rotate in unison.

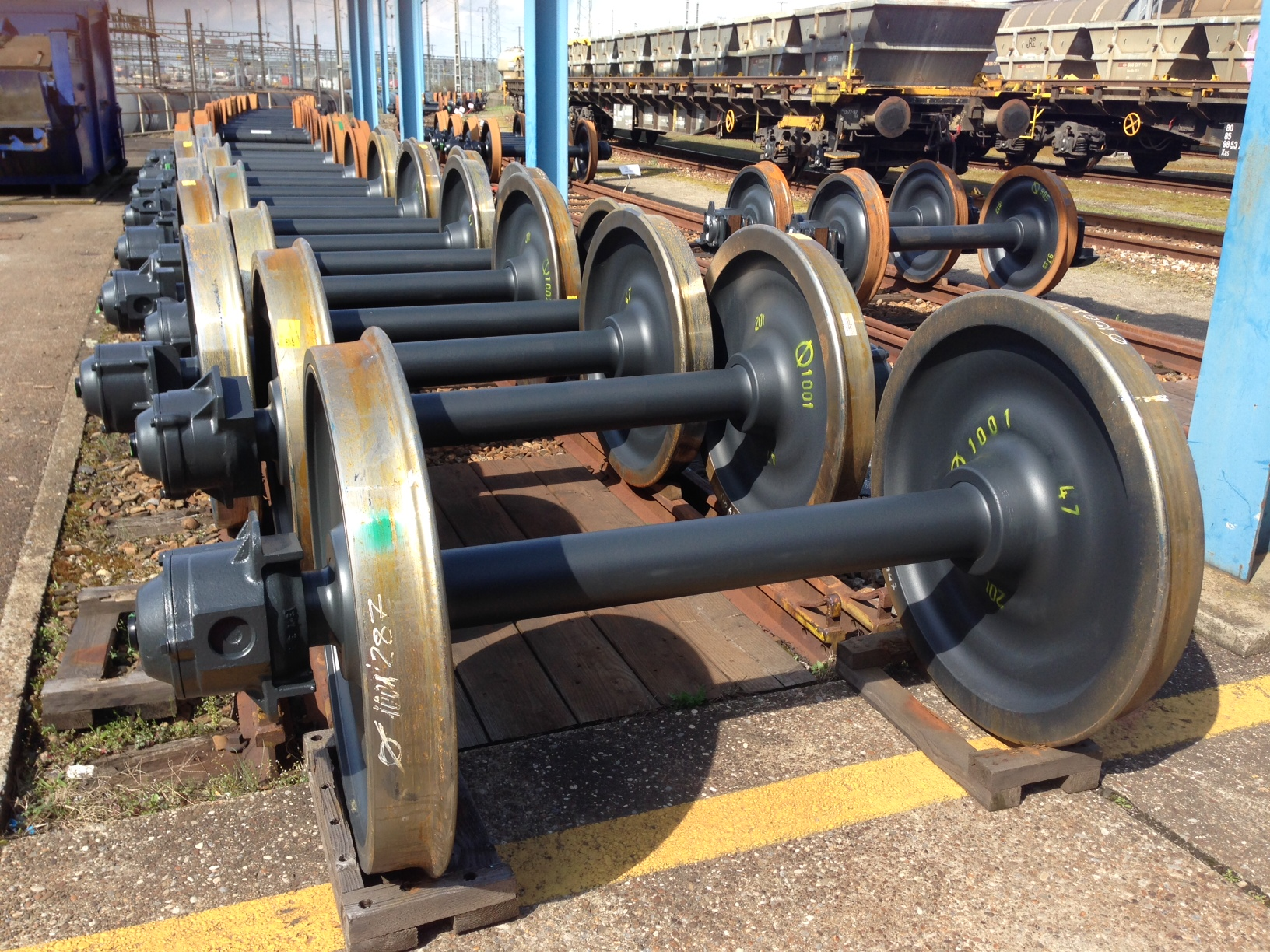
Swiss Federal Railways wheelsets with fitted journals

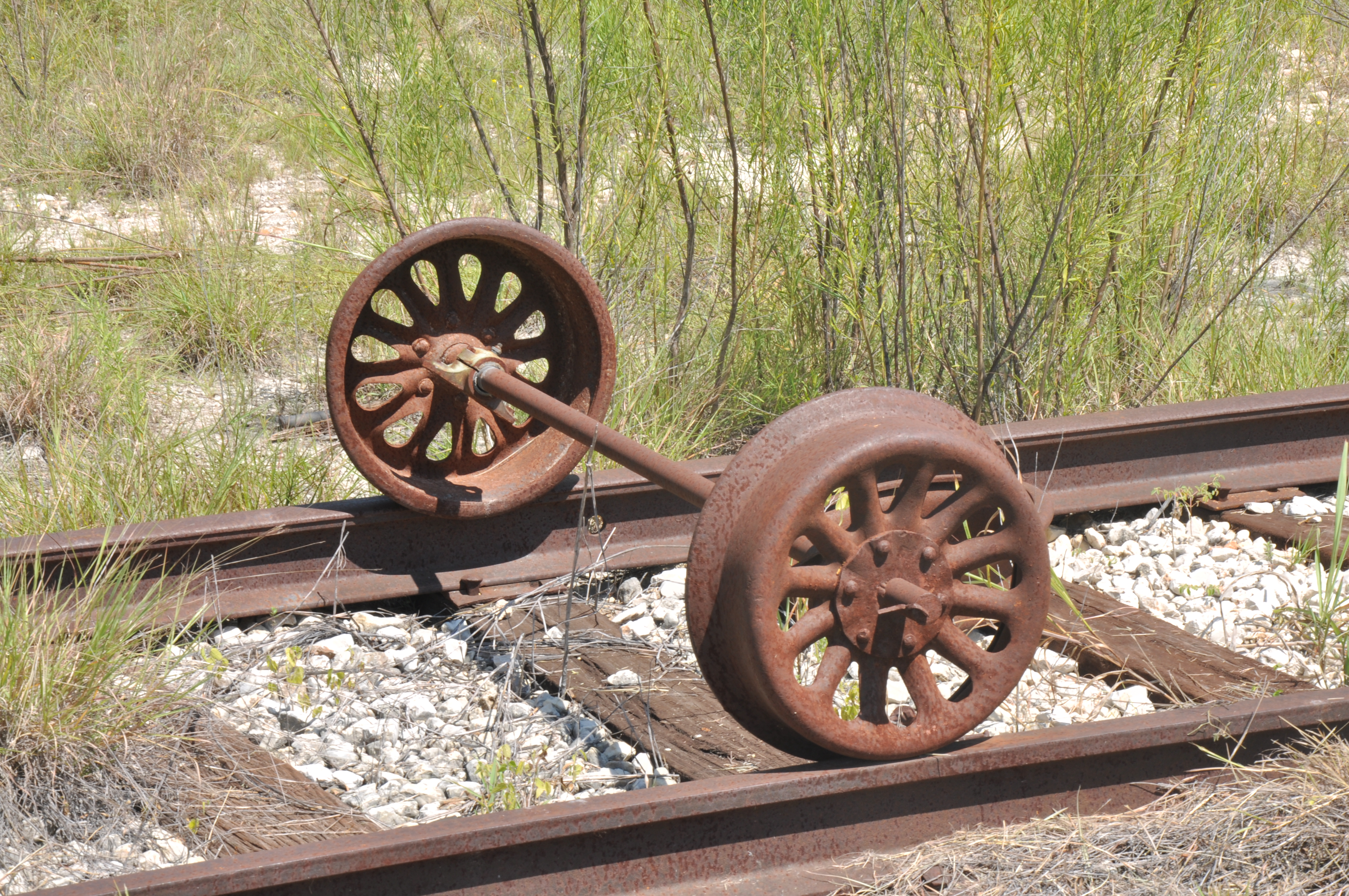
Wheelset from a railroad speeder. The wheels are pressed steel and the flanges are smaller than those of full-sized rail vehicles.

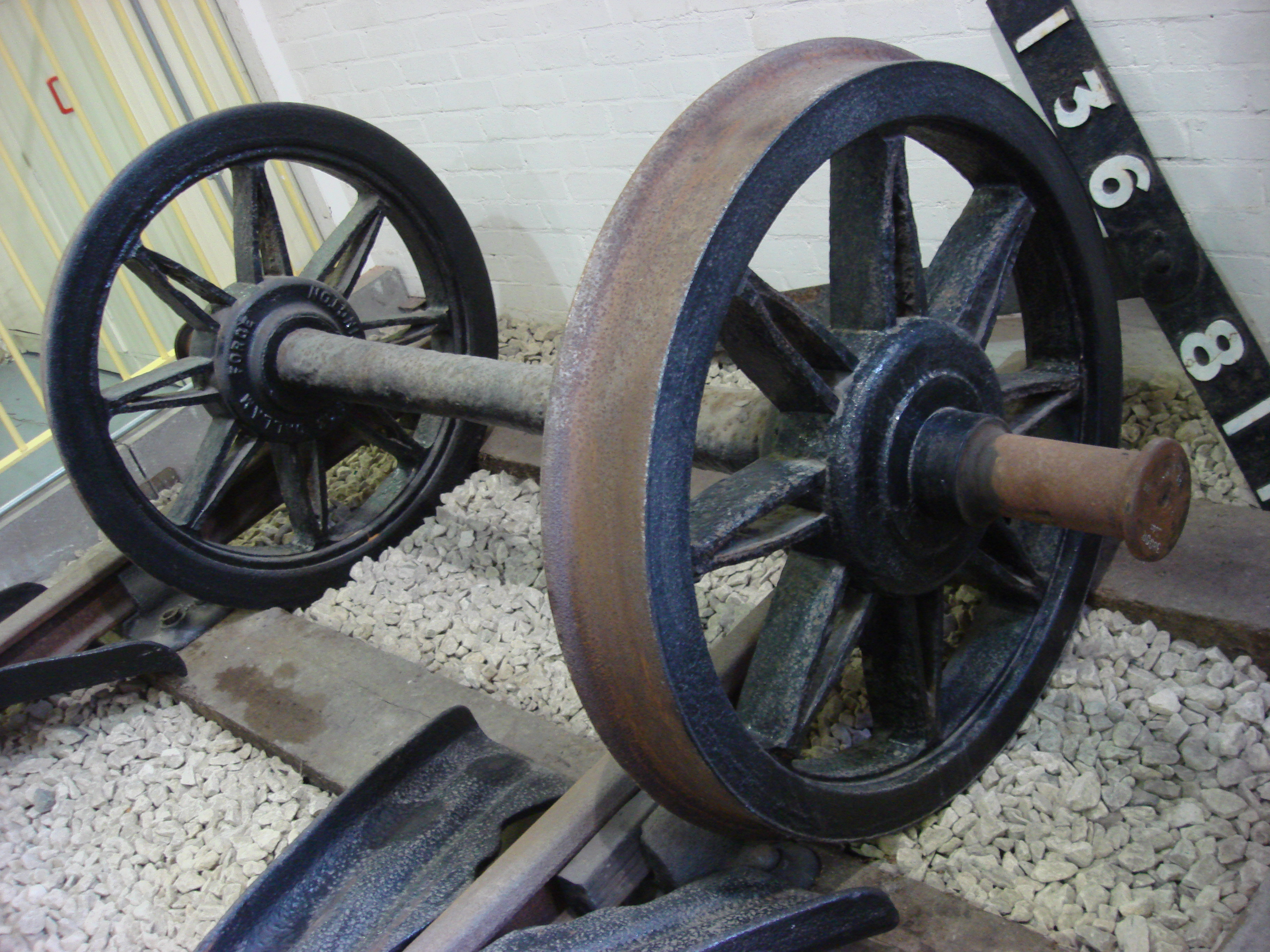
A wheelset from a Great Western Railway wagon, showing a plain bearing end

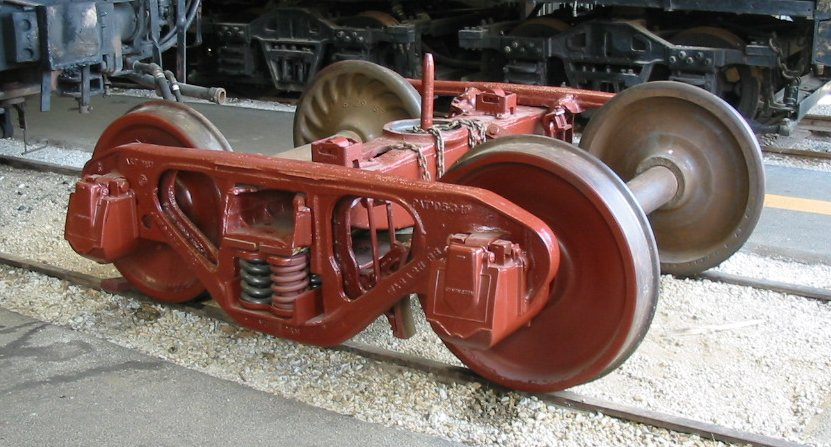
A freight bogie of the Bettendorf pattern, which became standard in North America and elsewhere

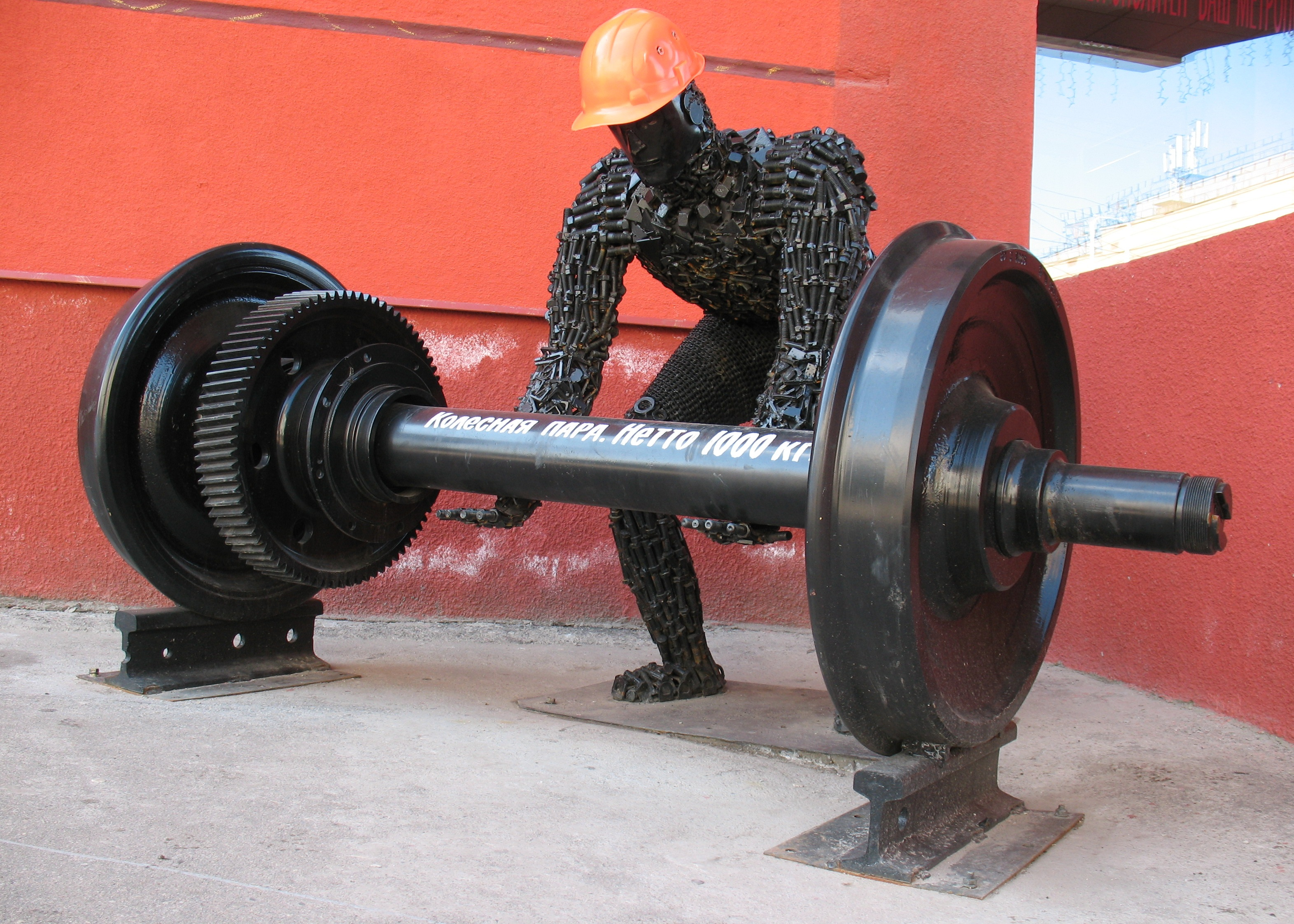
Wheelset as part of a welded sculpture in Kharkiv

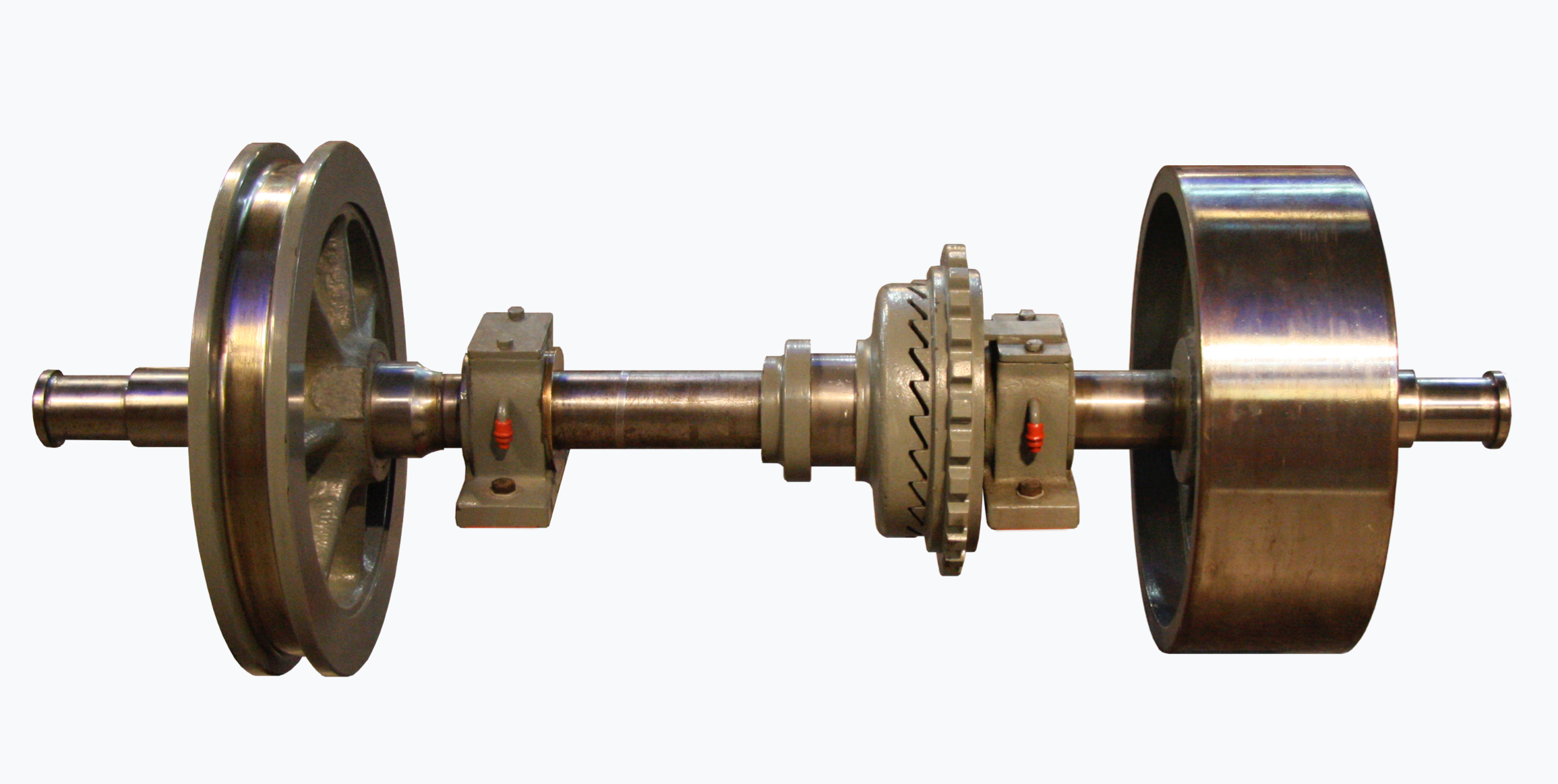
Wheelset of a two-rail funicular with the Abt switch turnout

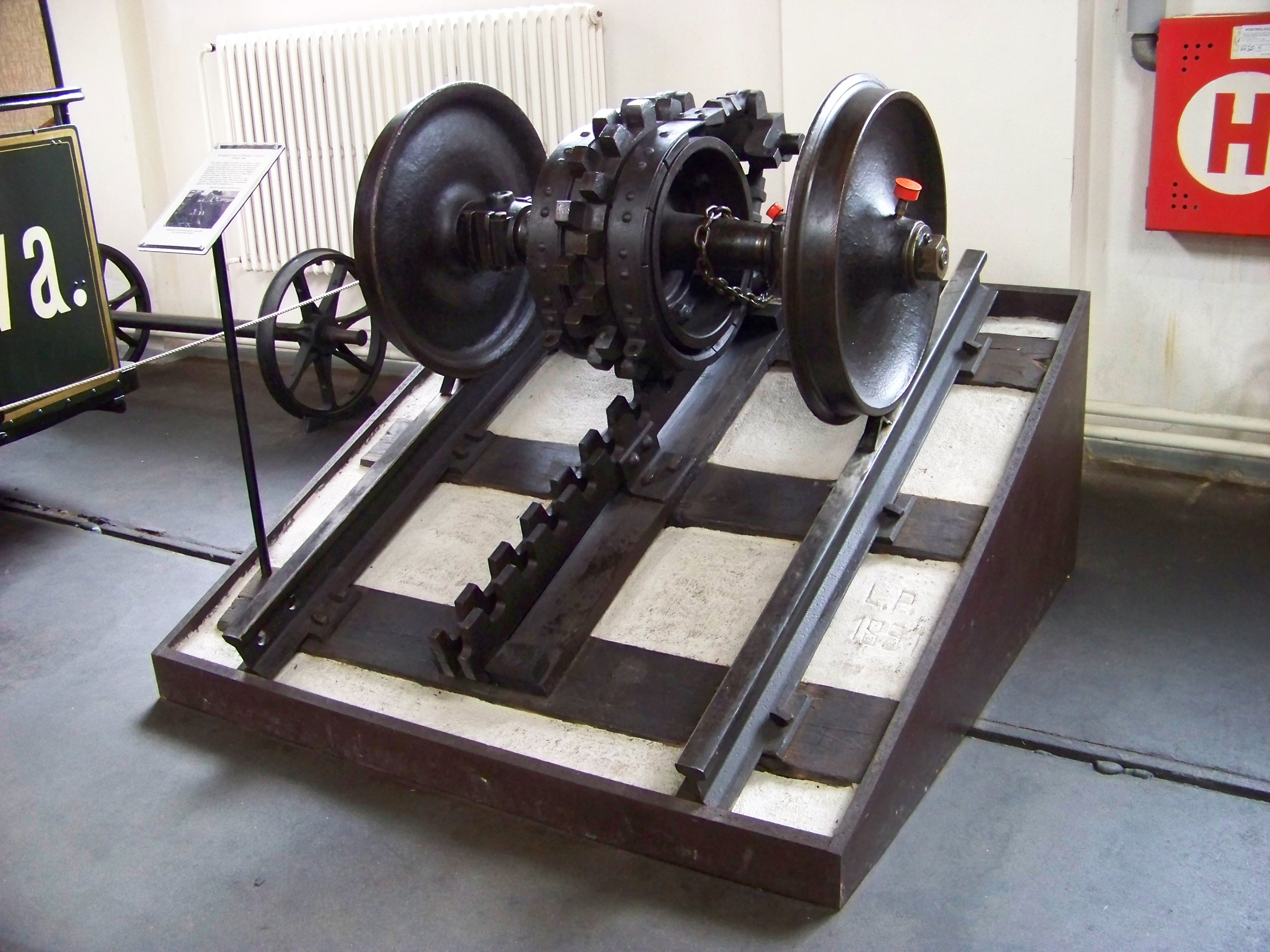
Funicular wheelset with Abt rack and pinion brake

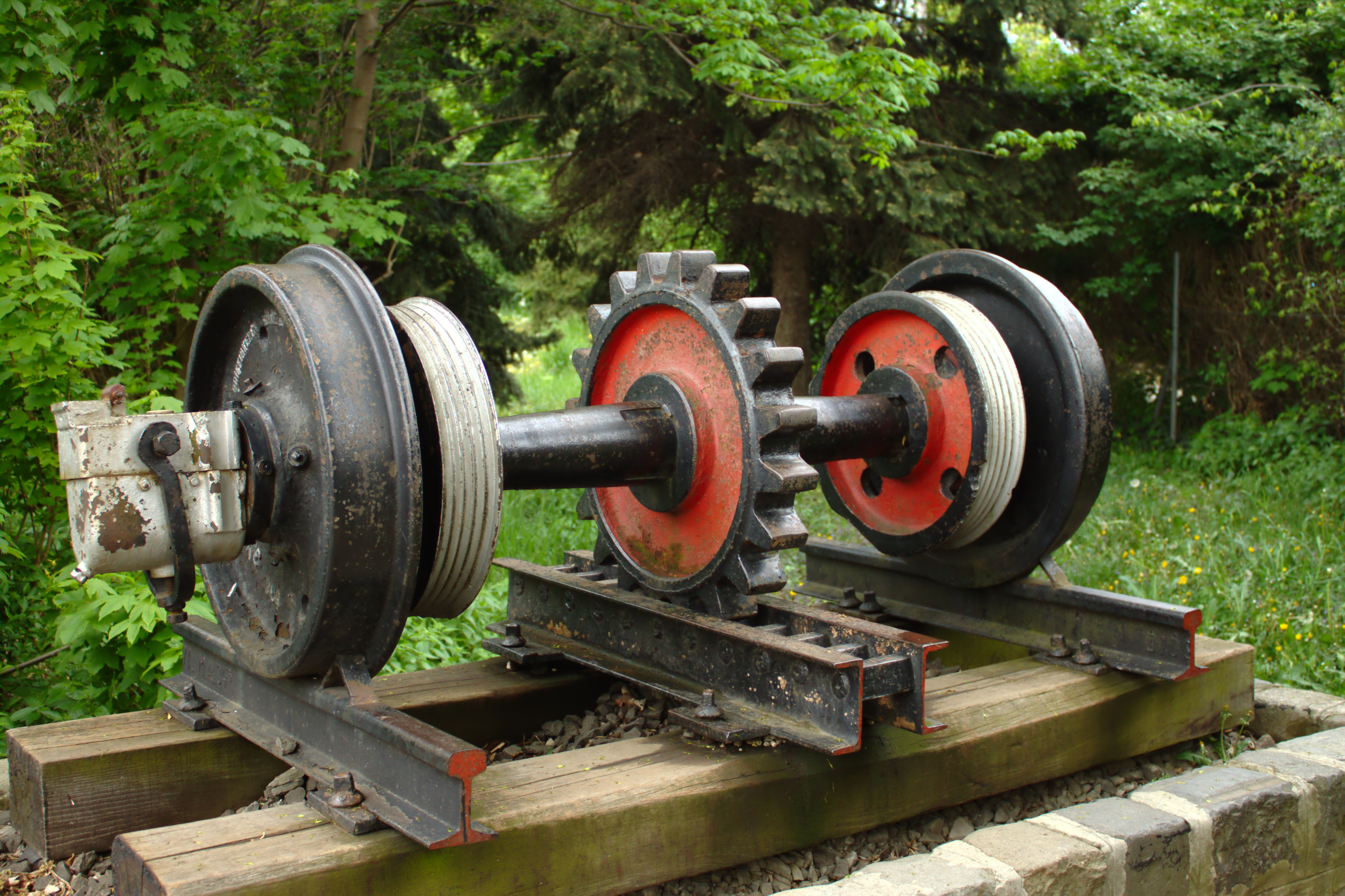
Wheelset of a rack railway

== See also ==
- Axle box
- Beam axle
- Axle exchange
- Drop table
- Flat spot
- Gölsdorf axle
- Interference fit
- International Heavy Haul Association
- Journal box
- List of railroad truck parts
- Luttermöller axle
- Plain bearing
- Rolling-element bearing
- Train wheel
- Variable gauge axles
- Wheelbase
- Wheel gauge
