= 1971 Salem, Illinois, derailment =

Train crash in Salem, Illinois on June 10, 1971

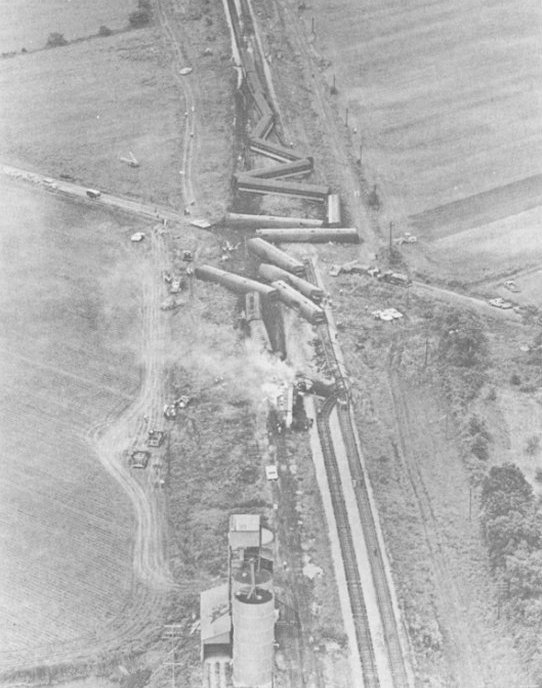
- Aerial view of the wreck

Details
- Date: June 10, 1971; 55 years ago about 12:30 P.M.
- Location: Salem, Illinois
- Coordinates: 38°39′56″N 88°58′39″W
- Country: United States
- Line: Illinois Central Railroad
- Operator: Amtrak
- Incident type: Derailment
- Cause: Mechanical fault on lead engine

Statistics
- Trains: 1
- Passengers: 211
- Deaths: 10
- Injured: 163

The 1971 Salem, Illinois derailment occurred on June 10, 1971, when Amtrak's City of New Orleans passenger train derailed near Salem, Illinois. It is sometimes referred to as the Tonti derailment, after the unincorporated community of Tonti, Illinois, which was the site of the crash. An investigation by the National Transportation Safety Board (NTSB) found that the derailment was caused by a false flange on a flat wheel caused by a seized axle bearing. The crash killed 10 people and injured 163. It was Amtrak's first fatal accident since assuming control of most intercity passenger trains in the United States on May 1, 1971.

== Accident ==
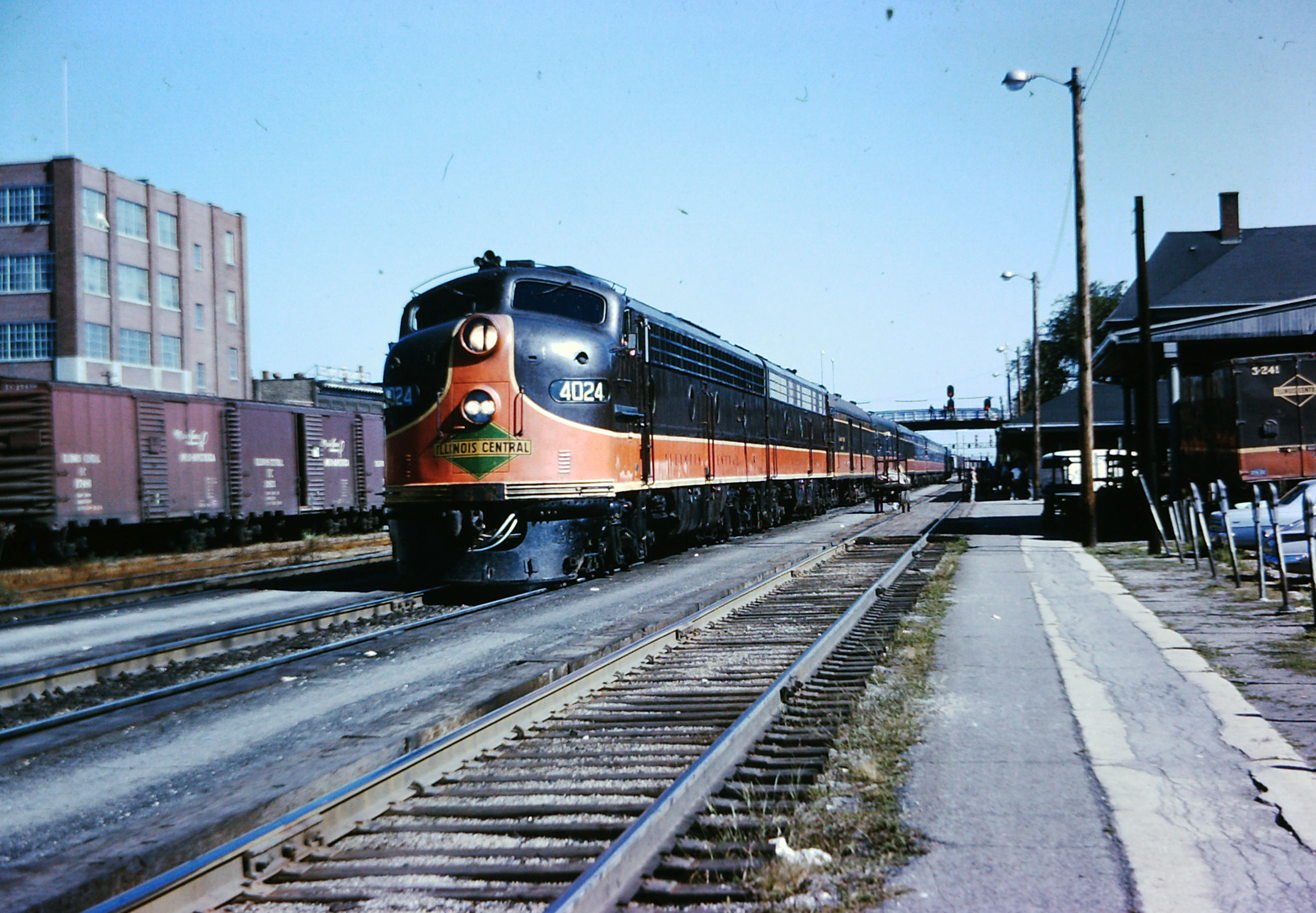
Illinois Central EMD E8 #4026, sister locomotive to #4031, leading the City of Miami through Kankakee, Illinois, in 1964

Amtrak #1, the City of New Orleans (Note: Between May 1, 1971, and November 14, 1971, when Amtrak issued a new timetable, all trains were officially nameless and used the numbers assigned by their previous operator. This train had been Illinois Central #1, the City of New Orleans. Amtrak replaced it with the Panama Limited in November.) departed Chicago's Central Station at 8:00 AM CT on June 10, 1971. The City of New Orleans was a daytime train between Chicago and New Orleans, Louisiana. Up until April 30, 1971, it had been operated by the Illinois Central Railroad, but passed to Amtrak when the latter assumed operation of most intercity service in the United States. It was scheduled to arrive in New Orleans at 1:30 AM on June 11. The train was composed of 15 cars: a baggage car, 11 coaches, a diner-counter, a lounge car, and a combination coach/food service car. Amtrak had inherited or leased this equipment from other railroads. A set of four leased Illinois Central EMD E-units of various models pulled the train: E8A #4031 (leading), E9Bs #4109 and #4106, and E10A (a rebuilt E8A) #2024 (formerly #4032). The train was carrying 211 passengers after departing Effingham.

The lead locomotive assigned to the train was #4031, an EMD E8A originally manufactured in 1952. The E8 developed 2,250 horsepower (1,680 kW) from two 12 cylinder model 567B engines, each driving a generator to power the two traction motors on one truck. During the run south from Chicago the #2 engine on #4031 failed and could not be repaired. After a crew change in Champaign, Illinois, the new crew observed the #2 engine respond to the throttle and concluded that it was operational again. South of Champaign the Illinois Central main line was double track with crossovers. As the train passed over one of these crossovers at Tonti, #4031 derailed.

#4031 was badly damaged in the derailment lying on its side 1,031 feet (314 m) south of the derailment point; #4109, immediately behind, caught fire and was destroyed. The rear two locomotives remained upright and suffered little damage. The lead baggage car and first five coaches were destroyed. The remaining eight cars suffered varying degrees of damage. Ten people were killed and 163 were injured. Six of the fatalities occurred when passengers were ejected through large side windows. It was Amtrak's first fatal accident.

== Investigation ==
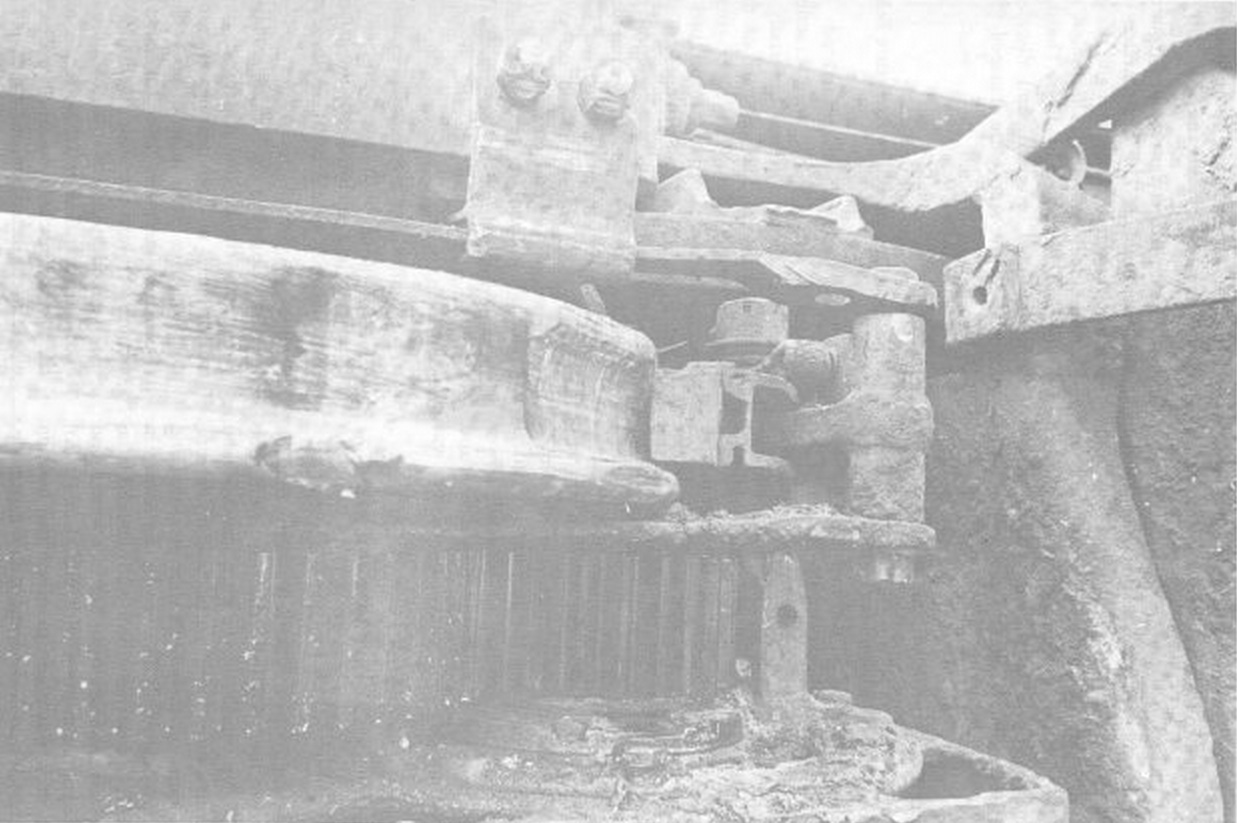
Flat spots on a wheel on #4031's rear truck

The NTSB investigation found flat spots on the rear truck of #4031. Inspection of the tracks between Tonti and Effingham, Illinois, revealed markings where the wheels had slid instead of spun. Further investigation revealed that the truck's traction motor had seized prior to the accident, and that the wheels had probably locked at Effingham during a station stop. The locked wheels created a false flange. When the compromised wheel reached the switch at the crossover at Tonti it derailed.

#4031 had made another run from Chicago to New Orleans on June 6. Engine #2 had failed on that trip as well and was shut down in New Orleans. As an added precaution the reverser for the engine was locked in neutral for trip to Chicago. Shutting down the engine and locking the reverser in neutral had the effect of disabling the wheel slip indicator, which would notify the locomotive engineer that a wheel was slipping or sliding. While #4031 was repaired in Chicago, the Illinois Central maintenance forces did not observe that the reverser was locked and did not realize that power was not being supplied to the rear truck.

== Aftermath ==
The NTSB found that the mechanical faults in Illinois Central locomotive #4031 caused the derailment. It recommended improvements in wheel-slip detection devices for locomotives and in pre-departure testing procedures. The NTSB also recommended that the Federal Railroad Administration (FRA) draft safety standards to address the ejection of passengers through windows in the event of accidents.

Around the beginning of 2025, Henderick Morton, a University of Missouri journalist student from Salem, Illinois started a goal of identifying the only unidentified decedent of the crash. When exhuming this person's grave, it was revealed through x-rays that there were at least two, possibly three, unidentified victims inside the grave, one of whom appeared to be a child. The DNA Doe Project later joined the investigation. On August 18, 2026, the DNA Doe Project announced that the remains belonged to 34-year-old Katherine Adams and her 3-year-old daughter Gladys Adams. The Adams girls, both from Chicago, were known to have perished in the crash.
