= Axle =

Central shaft for a rotating wheel or gear

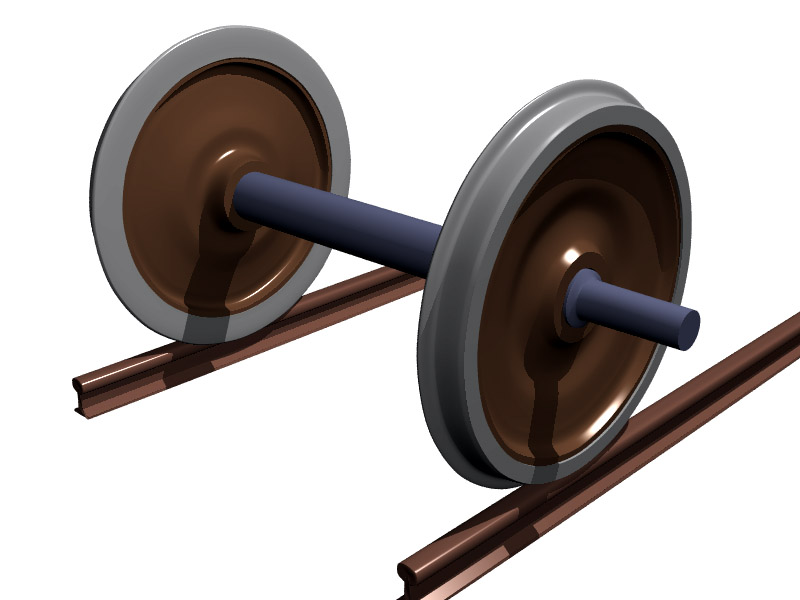
Railroad car wheels affixed to a straight axle, limiting them to rotate in unison. This is called a wheelset.

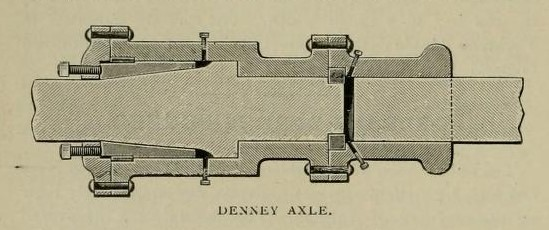
A Denney axle

An axle or axletree is a central shaft for a rotating wheel or gear. On wheeled vehicles, the axle may be fixed to the wheels, rotating with them, or fixed to the vehicle, with the wheels rotating around the axle. In the former case, bearings or bushings are provided at the mounting points where the axle is supported. In the latter case, a bearing or bushing sits inside a central hole in the wheel to allow the wheel or gear to rotate around the axle. Sometimes, especially on bicycles, the latter type of axle is referred to as a spindle.

== Terminology ==
On cars and trucks, several senses of the word axle occur in casual usage, referring to the shaft itself, its housing, or simply any transverse pair of wheels. Strictly speaking, a shaft that rotates with the wheel, being either bolted or splined in fixed relation to it, is called an axle or axle shaft. However, in looser usage, an entire assembly including the surrounding axle housing (typically a casting) is also called an axle.

An even broader (somewhat figurative) sense of the word refers to every pair of parallel wheels on opposite sides of a vehicle, regardless of their mechanical connection to each other and to the vehicle frame or body. Thus, transverse pairs of wheels in an independent suspension may be called an axle in some contexts. This very loose definition of "axle" is often used in assessing toll roads or vehicle taxes, and is taken as a rough proxy for the overall weight-bearing capacity of a vehicle, and its potential for causing wear or damage to roadway surfaces.

== Vehicle axles ==
Axles are an integral component of most practical wheeled vehicles. In a solid, "live-axle" suspension system, the rotating inner axle cores (or half-shafts) serve to transmit driving torque to the wheels at each end, while the rigid outer tube maintains the position of the wheels at fixed angles relative to the axle, and controls the angle of the axle and wheels assembly to the vehicle body. The solid axles (housings) in this system must also bear the weight of the vehicle plus any cargo. A non-driving axle, such as the front beam axle in heavy-duty trucks and some two-wheel drive light trucks and vans, will have no shaft, and serves only as a suspension and steering component. Conversely, many front-wheel drive cars have a one-piece rear beam axle.

In other types of suspension systems, the axles serve only to transmit driving torque to the wheels: the position and angle of the wheel hubs is made independent from the axles by the function of the suspension system. This is typical of the independent suspensions found on most newer cars, and even SUVs, and on the front of many light trucks. An exception to this rule is the independent (rear) swing axle suspension, wherein the half-axles are also load-bearing suspension arms.

Independent drive-trains still need differentials (or diffs), but without fixed axle-housing tubes attached. The diff may be attached to the vehicle frame or body, and/or be integrated with the transmission (or gearbox) in a combined transaxle unit. The axle (half-)shafts then transmit driving torque to the wheels, usually via constant-velocity joints. Like a full floating axle system, the drive shafts in a front-wheel-drive independent suspension system do not support any vehicle weight.

== Structural features and design ==
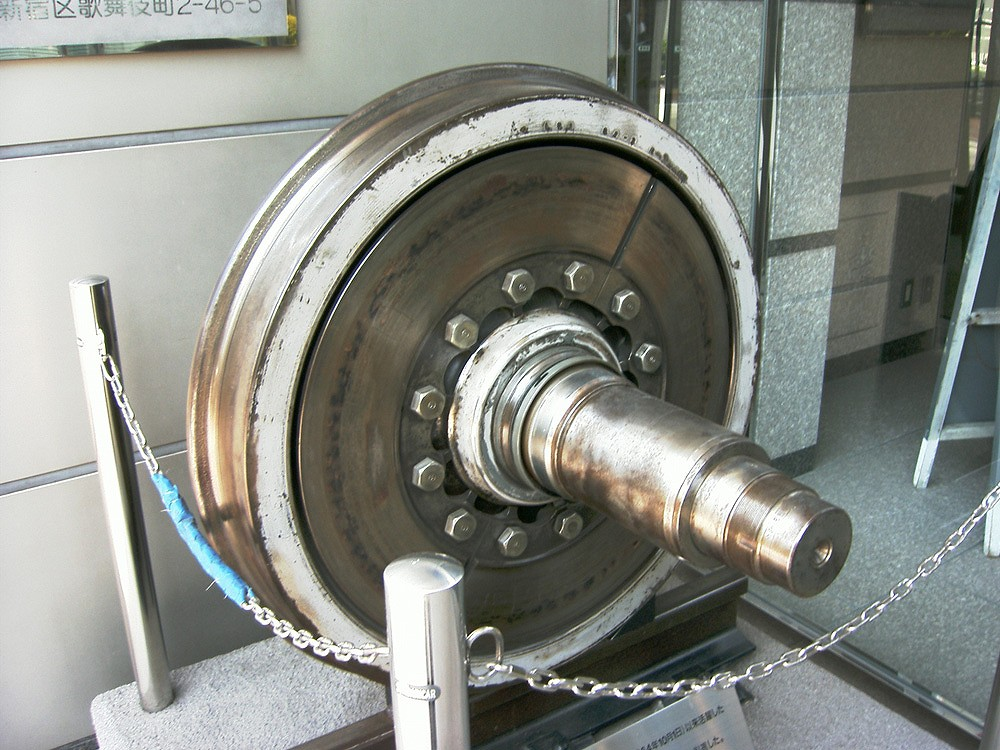
A 0 Series Shinkansen wheel used on Japanese high-speed bullet trains

A straight axle is a single rigid shaft connecting a wheel on the left side of the vehicle to a wheel on the right side. The axis of rotation fixed by the axle is common to both wheels. Such a design can keep the wheel positions steady under heavy stress, and can therefore support heavy loads. Straight axles are used on trains (that is, locomotives and railway wagons), for the rear axles of commercial trucks, and on heavy-duty off-road vehicles. The axle can optionally be protected and further reinforced by enclosing the length of the axle in a housing.

In split-axle designs, the wheel on each side is attached to a separate shaft. Modern passenger cars have split-drive axles. In some designs, this allows independent suspension of the left and right wheels, and therefore a smoother ride. Even when the suspension is not independent, split axles permit the use of a differential, allowing the left and right drive wheels to be driven at different speeds as the automobile turns, improving traction and extending tire life.

A tandem axle is a group of two or more axles situated close together. Truck designs use such a configuration to provide a greater weight capacity than a single axle. Semi-trailers usually have a tandem axle at the rear.

Axles are typically made from SAE grade 41xx steel or SAE grade 10xx steel. SAE grade 41xx steel is commonly known as "chrome-molybdenum steel" (or "chrome-moly") while SAE grade 10xx steel is known as "carbon steel". The primary differences between the two are that chrome-moly steel is significantly more resistant to bending or breaking, and is very difficult to weld with tools normally found outside a professional welding shop.

== Drive axle ==
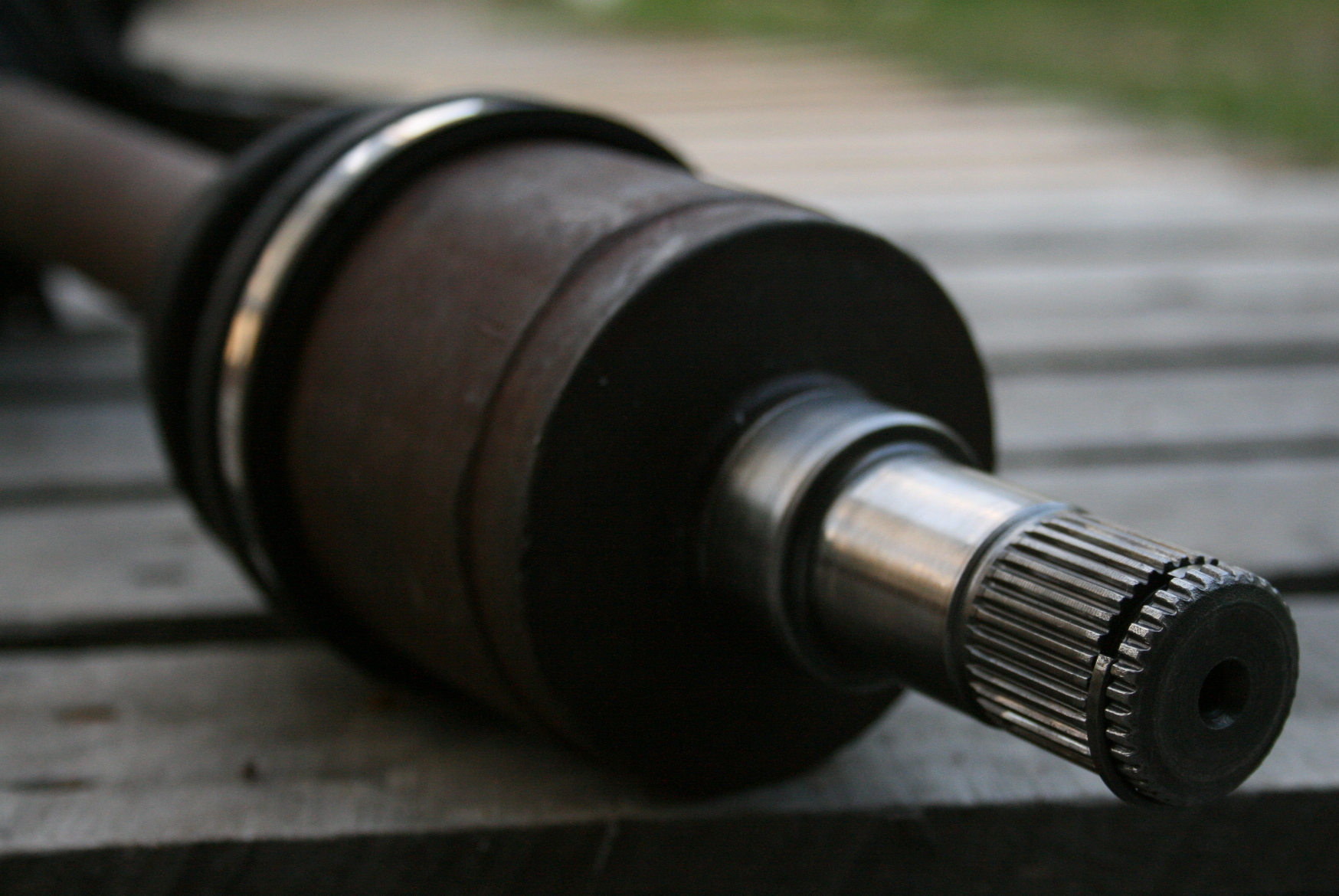
Splines on a front drive axle

An axle that is driven by the engine or prime mover is called a drive axle.

Modern front-wheel drive cars typically combine the transmission (gearbox and differential) and front axle into a single unit called a transaxle. The drive axle is a split axle with a differential and universal joints between the two half axles. Each half axle connects to the wheel by use of a constant velocity (CV) joint which allows the wheel assembly to move freely vertically as well as to pivot when making turns.

In rear-wheel drive cars and trucks, the engine turns a driveshaft (also called a propeller shaft or tailshaft) which transmits the rotational force to a drive axle at the rear of the vehicle. The drive axle may be a live axle, but modern rear-wheel drive automobiles generally use a split axle with a differential. In this case, one half-axle or half-shaft connects the differential with the left rear wheel, a second half-shaft does the same with the right rear wheel; thus the two half-axles and the differential constitute the rear axle. The front drive axle is providing the force to drive the truck. In fact, only one wheel of that axle is actually moving the truck and trailer down the road.

Some simple vehicle designs, such as leisure go-karts, may have a single driven wheel where the drive axle is a split axle with only one of the two shafts driven by the engine, or else have both wheels connected to one shaft without a differential (kart racing). However, other go-karts have two rear drive wheels too.

== Lift axle ==
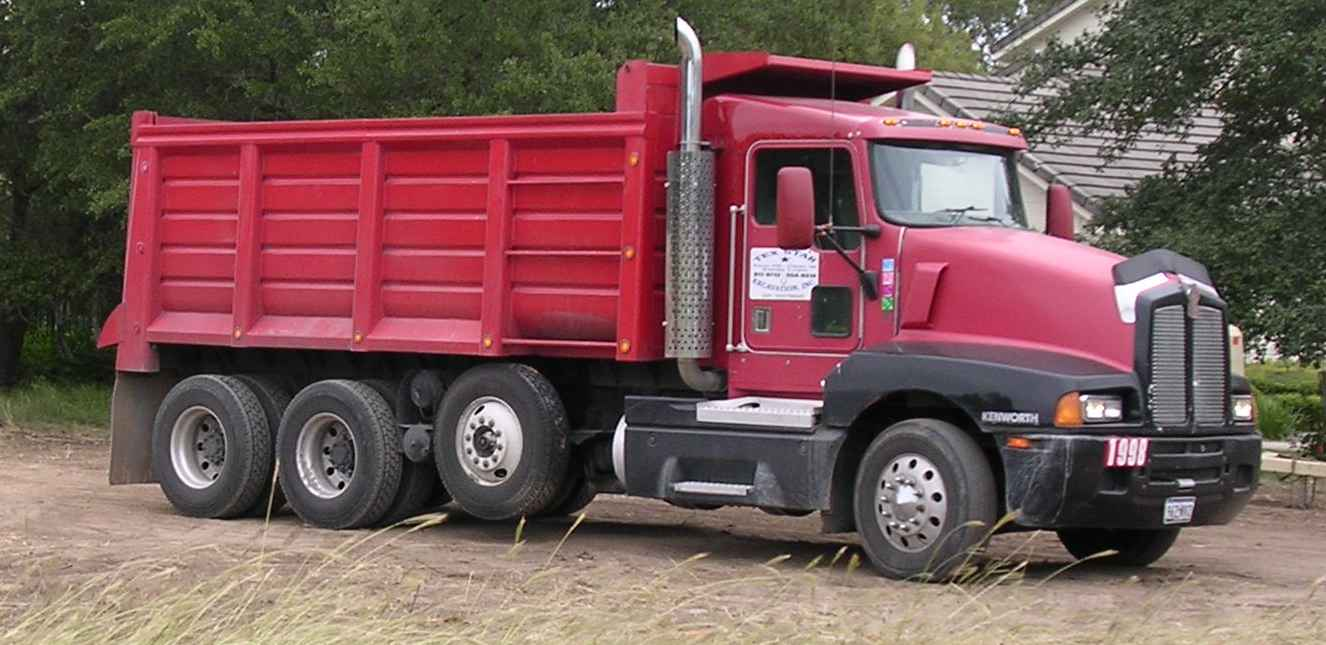
A dump truck with an airlift pusher axle shown in the raised position

Some dump trucks, flatbed trucks, cement mixers, concrete pumps, motorcoaches, motorhomes, and trailers may be configured with a lift axle (also known as an airlift axle or drop axle), which may be mechanically raised or lowered. Lift axles placed behind the steer axle and before the drive axles are known as pusher axles and are typically found in vocational trucks such as dump trucks, flatbed trucks with rear-mounted forklifts, concrete pumps, and cement mixers. Lift axles placed behind the drive axles are known as tag axles and are found on rear-engined motorcoaches and large rear-engined Class A “diesel pusher” motorhomes. These axles are lowered to increase the weight capacity, or to distribute the weight of the cargo over more wheels, for example, to cross a weight-restricted bridge. When not needed, the axle is lifted off the ground to save wear on the tires and axle, and to increase traction in the remaining wheels, and to decrease fuel consumption. Lifting an axle also alleviates lateral scrubbing of the additional axle in very tight turns, allowing the vehicle to turn more readily. In some situations, the removal of pressure from the additional axle is necessary for the vehicle to complete a turn at all.

Several manufacturers offer computer-controlled airlifts so that the dead axles are automatically lowered when the main axle reaches its weight limit. The dead axles can still be lifted by the press of a button if needed, for better maneuverability.

Lift axles were in use in the early 1940s. Initially, the axle was lifted by a mechanical device. Soon hydraulics replaced the mechanical lift system. One of the early manufacturers was Zetterbergs, located in Östervåla, Sweden. Their brand was Zeta-lyften.

The liftable tandem drive axle was invented in 1957 by the Finnish truck manufacturer Vanajan Autotehdas, a company sharing history with Sisu Auto.

== Full-floating vs semi-floating ==
A full-floating axle carries the vehicle's weight on the axle casing, not the half-shafts; they serve only to transmit torque from the differential to the wheels. They "float" inside an assembly that carries the vehicle's weight. Thus the only stress it must endure is torque (not lateral bending force). Full-floating axle shafts are retained by a flange bolted to the hub, while the hub and bearings are retained on the spindle by a large nut.

In contrast, a semi-floating design carries the weight of the vehicle on the axle shaft itself; there is a single bearing at the end of the axle housing that carries the load from the axle and that the axle rotates through. To be "semi-floating" the axle shafts must be able to "float" in the housing, bearings and seals, and not subject to axial "thrust" and/or bearing preload. Needle bearings and separate lip seals are used in semi-floating axles with axle retained in the housing at their inner ends typically with circlips which are 3¾-round hardened washers that slide into grooves machined at the inner end of the shafts and retained in/by recesses in the differential carrier side gears which are themselves retained by the differential pinion gear (or "spider gear") shaft. A true semi-floating axle assembly places no side loads on the axle housing tubes or axle shafts.

Axles that are pressed into ball or tapered roller bearings, which are in turn retained in the axle housings with flanges, bolts, and nuts do not "float" and place axial loads on the bearings, housings, and only a short section of the shaft itself, that also carries all radial loads.

The full-floating design is typically used in most ¾- and 1-ton light trucks, medium-duty trucks, and heavy-duty trucks. The overall assembly can carry more weight than a semi-floating or non-floating axle assembly because the hubs have two bearings riding on a fixed spindle. A full-floating axle can be identified by a protruding hub to which the axle shaft flange is bolted.

The semi-floating axle setup is commonly used on half-ton and lighter 4×4 trucks in the rear. This setup allows the axle shaft to be the means of propulsion, and also support the weight of the vehicle. The main difference between the full- and semi-floating axle setups is the number of bearings. The semi-floating axle features only one bearing, while the full-floating assembly has bearings on both the inside and outside of the wheel hub. The other difference is axle removal. To remove the semi-floating axle, the wheel must be removed first; if such an axle breaks, the wheel is most likely to come off the vehicle. The semi-floating design is found under most ½-ton and lighter trucks, as well as in SUVs and rear-wheel-drive passenger cars, usually being smaller or less expensive models.

A benefit of a full-floating axle is that even if an axle shaft (used to transmit torque or power) breaks, the wheel will not come off, preventing serious accidents.

== See also ==
- Solid axle
- Gölsdorf axle
- Klien-Lindner axle
- List of auto parts
- Luttermöller axle
- Portal axle
- Powertrain
- Transaxle
- Wagon wheel (transportation)
- Wheel and axle
- Wheelset (rail transport)
