= Traffic noise =

Traffic noise may include:

- Roadway noise
- Railway noise
- Aircraft noise

== See also ==
- Ambience (sound recording)
- Environmental noise
- Noise pollution
