= Flat spot =

Fault in railroad wheel shape

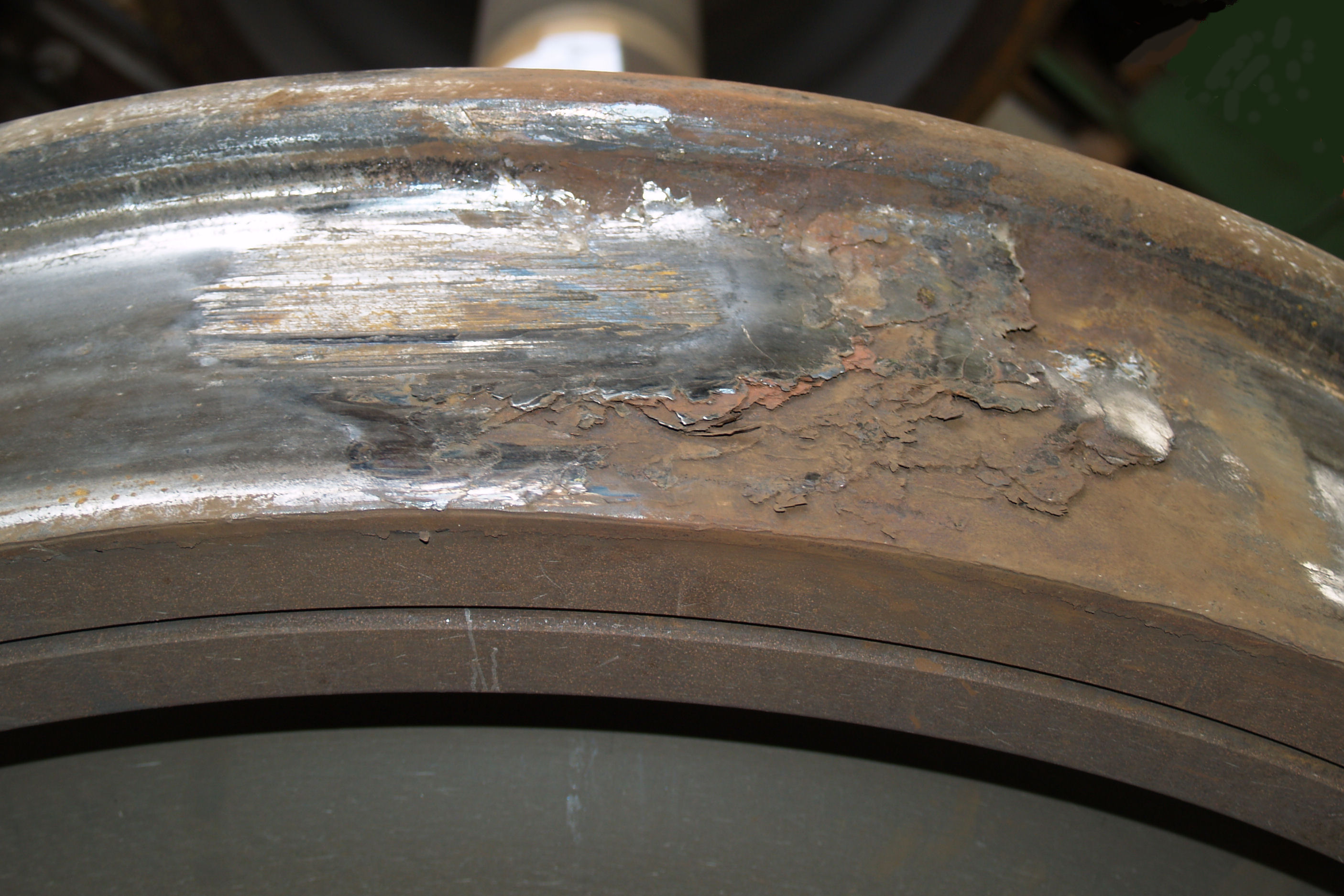
A severe flat spot on a train wheel.

A flat spot, or wheel flat, also called spalling or shelling, is a defect in the shape and structure of a train wheel. A flat spot occurs when a locomotive's or railroad car's wheelset stops rotating while the train is still moving. Friction causes the part of the wheel scraping against the hardened steel of the rails to ablate. Flat spots are usually caused when the emergency brake is applied, or when environmental conditions (such as during autumn (leaves) and winter (ice)) cause slippery rails, resulting in the wheels locking up while the train is still moving.

== Railways ==
NORAC guidelines state that the train may continue at normal speed if the flat spot is less than 2.5 inches long, or, in the case of multiple adjacent flat spots, each is shorter than 2 inches. The fault is removed later in the wheelset turning process, using a wheel lathe. However, because of the heat suffered while being dragged along the rail and the impacts suffered afterward, these wheels are more likely to break due to changes in the alloy structure.

If the flat spot is sufficiently large, strands of molten metal may have stuck on one side of the flat spot, making it impossible for the wheel to turn due to insufficient clearance between the rolling surface and the brake shoe. In this case, the wheelset must be replaced immediately.

In extreme cases such as the 1971 Salem, Illinois derailment a wheel with an untreated flat spot can potentially damage the track and cause a derailment.

== Cars and road vehicles ==
=== Engine response ===
In automobile parlance, a flat spot occurs when the driver presses the gas pedal and there is a delay in the engine's response. This fault was more common before cars had electronic fuel injection. Many engines, especially modified ones, still have flat spots in the torque curve due to resonances in the intake system, although manufacturers try to eliminate these by use of a plenum chamber, careful design and testing.

=== Car tires ===
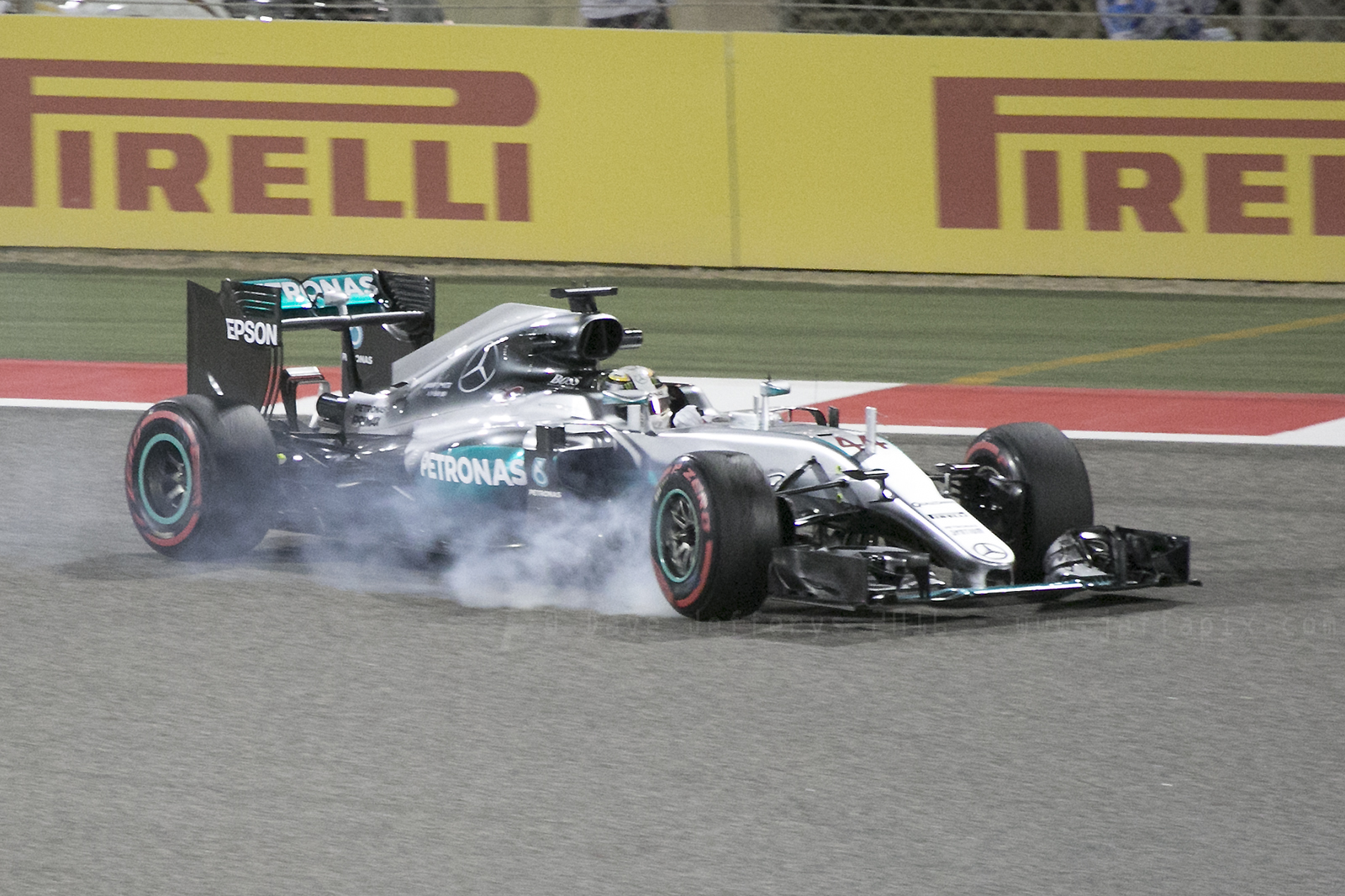
Lewis Hamilton locks his brakes during heavy braking

A literal flat spot can occur on car tires if the vehicle is parked without moving for some time (generally longer than a week), and the tire deformation at the bottom of the wheel becomes semi-permanent. The flat spot gradually relieves itself when the car is driven but can temporarily give similar symptoms to an unbalanced wheel. Cars being laid up for extended periods, or intermittently-used caravans and trailers, should be kept on axle stands (tyres not in contact with the ground) or have the tires over-inflated to eliminate or reduce this problem. "Tire savers", curved wheel stands, are also available for use during storage. These reduce or avoid the problem by cradling the lower part of the tire tread and preventing the usual deformation where it rests on the ground.

Another cause seen frequently in racing is locking the wheels during heavy braking.
