= Ocean Pier Railway at Atlantic City =

Railway in New Jersey

Ocean Pier Railway
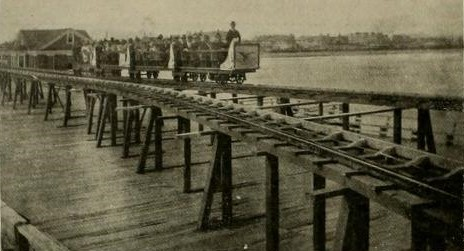
- Ocean Pier Railway at Atlantic City with a train of four cars out on the pier some distance from shore

Overview
- Locale: Atlantic City, New Jersey
- Dates of operation: 1897–

Technical
- Track gauge: 2 ft 9 in (838 mm)
- Length: 1,900 feet (580 m)

The Ocean Pier Railway at Atlantic City was an electric narrow gauge railway, which ran over the entire length of the Ocean Pier in Atlantic City, about 1,900 feet (580 m) into the ocean.

== History ==
The Ocean Pier at Atlantic City was extended by 500 feet (150 m) in 1896/97. At the same time it was widened, and the railway, a fishing platform and several pavilions were built. The gauge of the railway was 2 ft 9 in (838 mm). At the shore loop the distance between the inner rails was 30 feet (9.14 m), which necessitated a very sharp curve. The loop at the ocean end was broader and permitted a curve with 60 feet (18.3 m) diameter. The power station was located at the inner end of the pier. Mr Young and Mr McShea were the builders and operated the railway line. The scenic ride and view of the city made the railroad popular with the summer visitors.

== Rolling stock ==
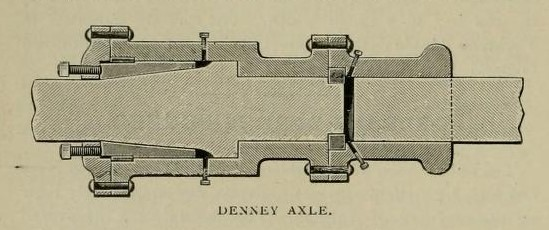
Denney axle

To prevent excessive friction and wear on the wheels Denney's divided axles were used, which permitted the wheels to rotate independently of each other. The coupling was of gun metal, in three pieces, which were riveted together after the brasses were in place. The portion of the coupling shown at the right in the cut was shrunk into that half of the axle. The collar at the extreme end of the coned portion of the axle was also shrunk on. A long conical bearing with adjustable brasses was provided as shown. The joints of the coupling were tight so that it could be filled with oil. With this axle little trouble was experienced from the sharp curves.
