= Slippery rail =

Loss of traction in locomotives

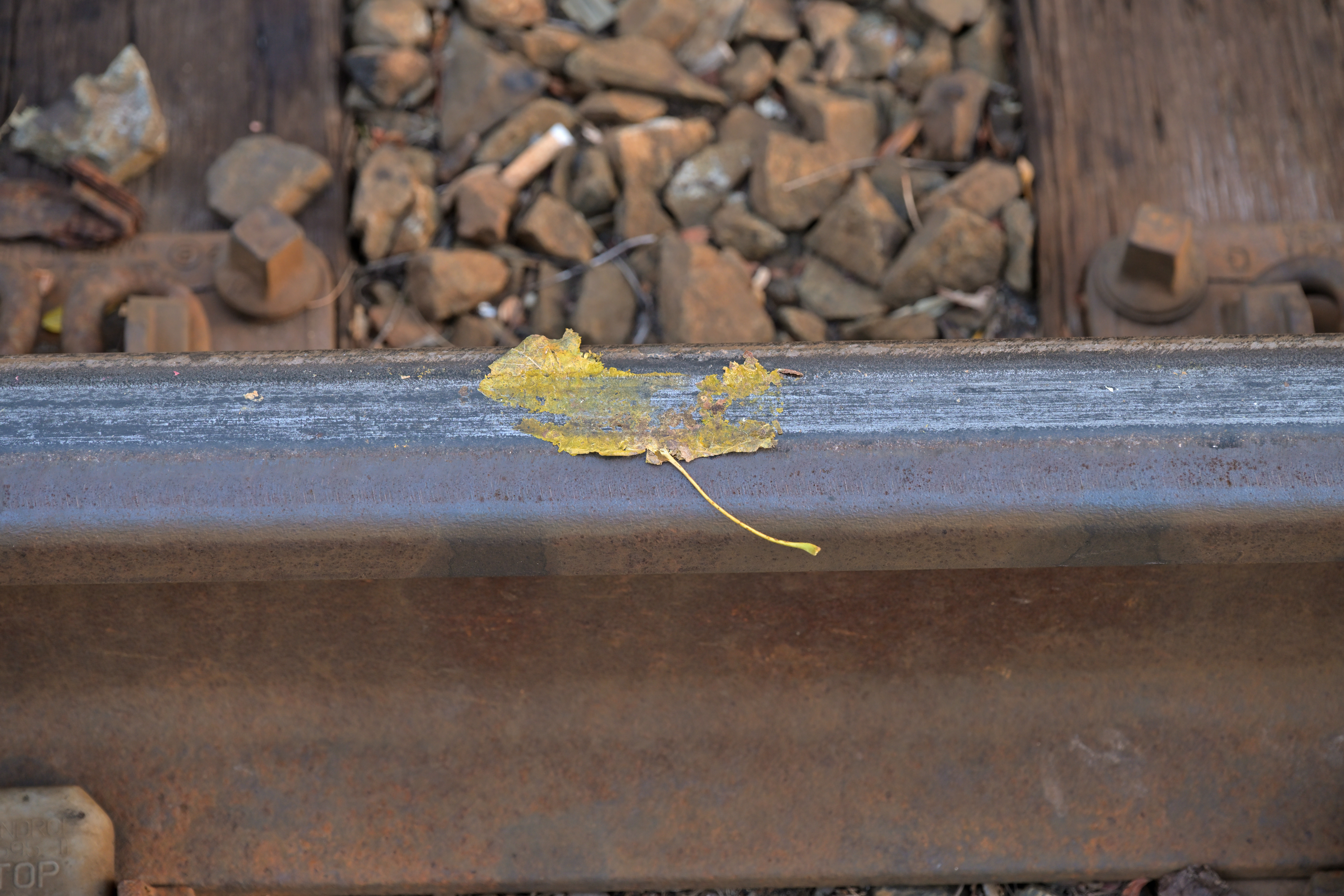
A fallen leaf crushed and smeared across the railhead by passing trains

Slippery rail, or low railhead adhesion, is a condition of railways (railroads) where contamination of the railhead reduces the traction between the wheel and the rail. This can lead to wheelslip when the train is taking power, and wheelslide when the train is braking. One common cause of contamination is fallen leaves that adhere to the railhead (top surface) of railway tracks. The condition results in significant reduction in friction between train wheels and rails, and in extreme cases can render the track temporarily unusable. In Britain, the situation is colloquially referred to as "leaves on the line".

== Low adhesion caused by weather ==
Railhead contamination caused by weather conditions can occur at any time of year.

The leaf fall season causes the most disruption to rail operations. In heavily deciduous forested areas like the American Mid-Atlantic states, New England, many parts of Europe including the UK, and Southern Ontario, Canada, the problem can arise. Where the leaves fall onto a railway route, some collect on the railhead and are then heavily compressed by trains into a slippery low-friction coating on the rail and on the wheel treads. If the climate is damp, the wet leaves adhere to the rail very effectively. The draft caused by the passage of the train causes nearby leaves to be caught up in air currents, and more leaves are deposited on the railhead. The build-up of this material is incremental, and it is hard enough not to be quickly worn away by the ordinary passage of trains.

Winter can provide problems of low adhesion when snow and ice are deposited on running lines. Just as with road vehicles, black ice can cause trains to encounter difficulty when starting away, or can initiate wheel slide during braking.

Even summer can have its problems. A light rain shower following a long period of dry weather can sometimes cause similar low adhesion conditions to those of leaf fall contamination. As the water dries it mixes with oxide debris and creates a paste that separates the wheel and rail reducing adhesion. Although the effect is only short term, its unpredictability can cause a significant incident to occur. A morning dew can have the same effect.

=== Disc brakes add to the problem ===
Before about 1960, most railway vehicles used brake shoes to stop the train by applying pressure on the wheel treads. Since then, disc brakes have increasingly been used, which means that cleaning the compressed leaf material from the wheel tread by abrasion no longer occurs.

=== Lack of lineside maintenance ===
A report by England's Commissioners of Railways of May 1851 noted that an accident was caused when a small locomotive hauling a heavy train was unable to find purchase on the rail because by the dirty state of the track ballast. It was the duty of the fireman when necessary to dismount from the locomotive and gather track ballast to throw under the driving wheels to maintain grip, but in this particular instance dirty ballast, containing a proportion of earth, failed to achieve the required outcome.

In the steam locomotive era, trees and other lineside vegetation would be regularly cut back to reduce the risk of their being ignited by sparks from the locomotive. As the railways ceased to use steam traction, this maintenance was allowed to lapse, and the resulting extra growth increases the supply of leaves thereby exacerbating the problem.

== Low adhesion caused by crushed insects ==
There are many substances which can cause low adhesion when they are deposited on the railhead. In Victoria, Australia, train wheels crushing plagues of introduced Portuguese millipedes which were crossing the tracks, caused passenger rail operator V/Line to be penalised more than $700,000 for cancellations and poor punctuality in one quarter of 2001. In 2009, railway tracks at Tallarook in central Victoria were also affected by a Portuguese millipede plague, causing several trains to be cancelled. The crushing of Portuguese millipedes is suspected to have caused a crash between two trains at Clarkson near Perth, Western Australia, in September 2013.

Slippery rails caused by caterpillars were reported in Queensland in 1938. Crushed locusts affected train operations on the Otavi Mining and Railway Company in South-West Africa (modern Namibia) in 1924.

== Effects ==
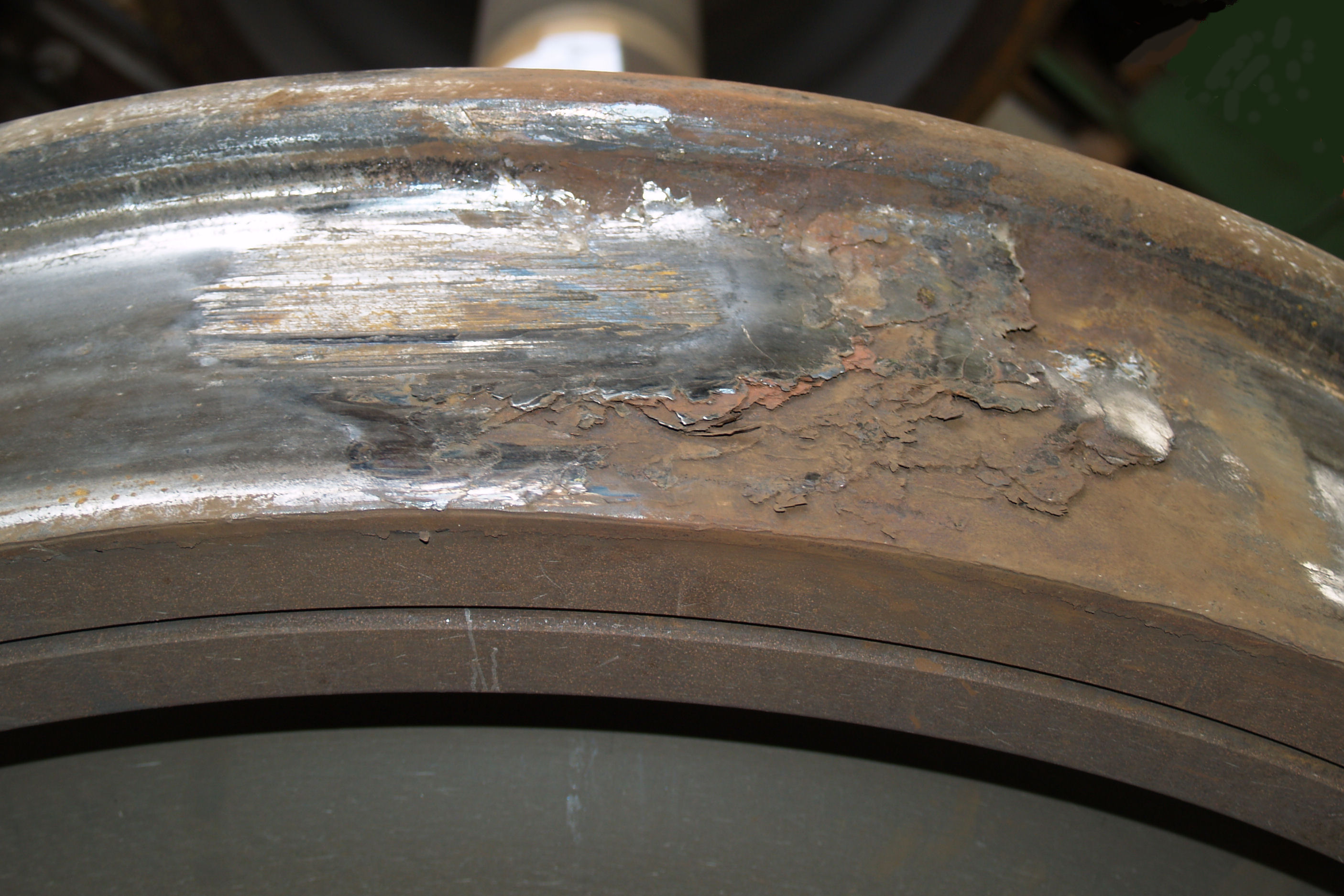
Flat spot

The loss of friction between wheels and rail results in loss of tractive force: the wheels begin to spin, and in some instances the train is unable to move. In braking, substantial loss of friction results in reduced braking force. Braking distances are considerably longer, and in extreme cases the wheels may even lock up, causing the train to slide. Modern locomotives and multiple units are equipped with Wheel slide protection to counter slippery rail conditions. Locked wheels can self-grind flat spots on the steel tyres, especially if the wheels are still sliding when arriving at a non-greasy section of rail, e.g. one that has previously been sanded. This causes the wheels to go out of profile (known colloquially as 'wheel flats'), which subsequently leads to severe vibration and the need for the wheels to be re-profiled or re-tyred at great expense.

In extreme cases, the build-up of leaf material can electrically insulate the wheels from the rails, resulting in a failure of signalling equipment to detect the presence of the train. Where the problem is severe, Track Circuit Actuators fitted to trains can help alleviate the problem.

In the United Kingdom, it was estimated that the poor adhesion problems cost the rail industry GBP 355 million (US$449 million) a year.

== Mitigation measures ==
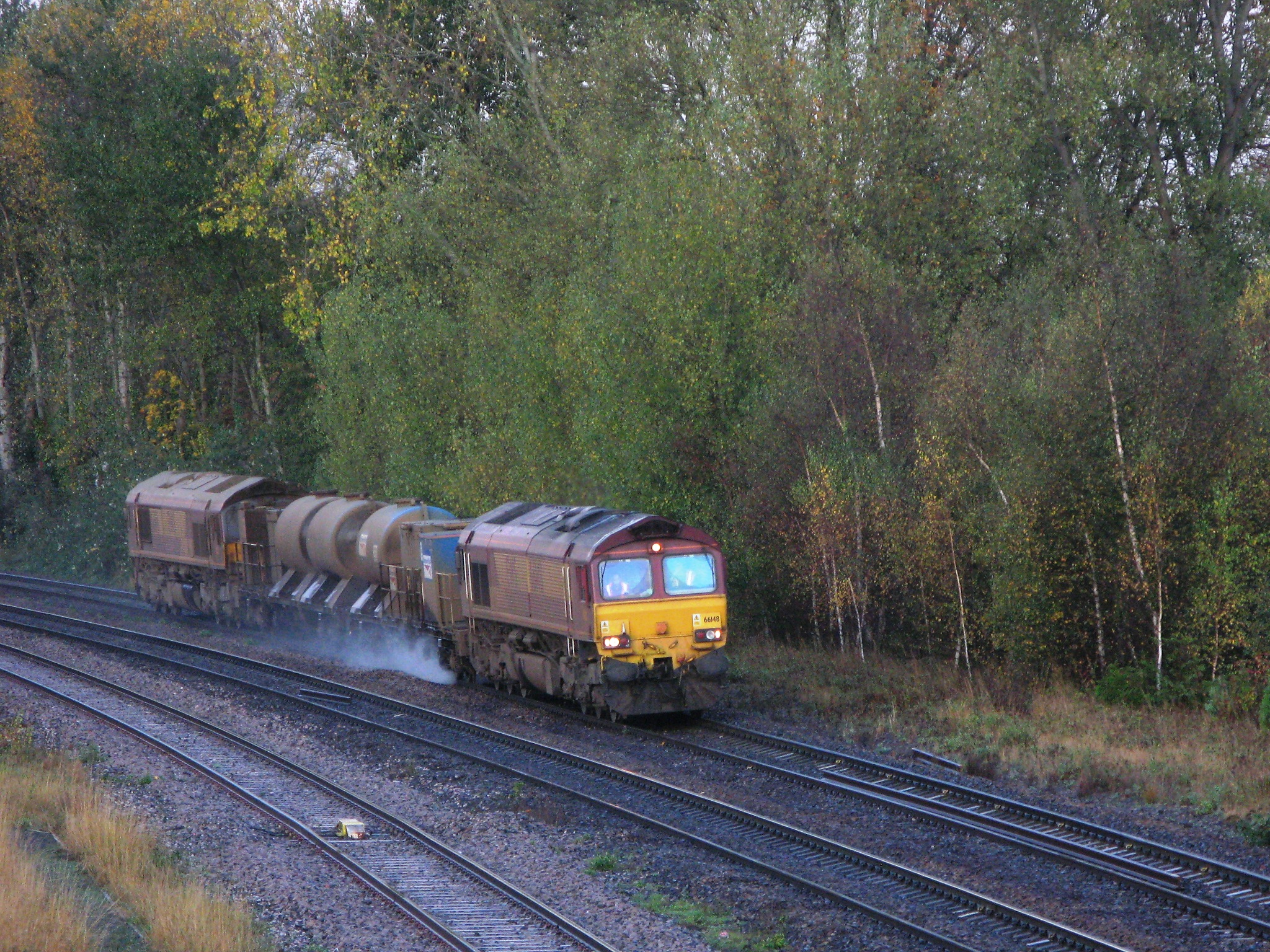
A Network Rail Railhead Treatment Train uses a high-pressure water jet to remove compressed leaf mulch from the rails in the United Kingdom.

=== Railhead treatment ===
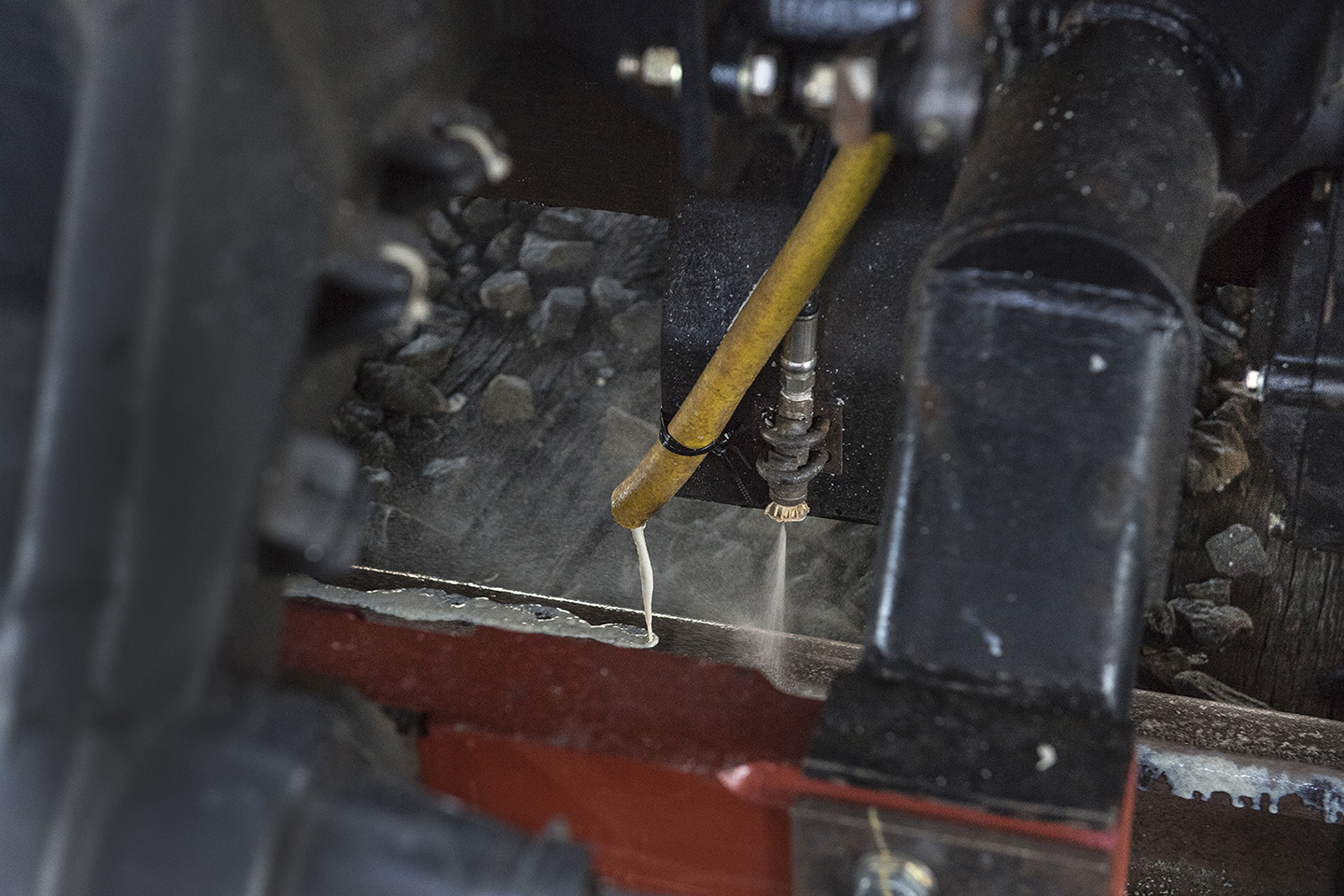
A Long Island Rail Road work train pressure-washes the rail before applying a traction gel.

Treatment measures generally involve some system to jet or blast the accumulated deposit away, or to coat it with a high-friction material. Blasting is usually carried out with water jets, often in combination with mechanical scrubbing apparatus. The coating method usually involves depositing sand in a paste on to the rail; as the sand may exacerbate the risk of unwanted insulation, the sand mix sometimes contains metal particles. The coating is applied from special trains (colloquially referred to as "Sandite trains" after the original proprietary mixture applied) and in some cases locally by hand applicators.

Lineside-fitted Traction gel applicators which apply liquid to the railhead as a train passes are fitted at sites where significant low adhesion regularly occurs, such as on the approach to stations.

Both of these processes are effective for a limited duration; the jetting method is ineffective as soon as the next leaf falls; the sand deposition method is more durable, although rainfall usually removes the deposited sand quickly. Another method is using a high voltage electrical spark or plasma to volatilize the deposited material, but this method has only been used experimentally, as it is hindered by high power consumption, noise and rail degradation.

=== Lasers ===
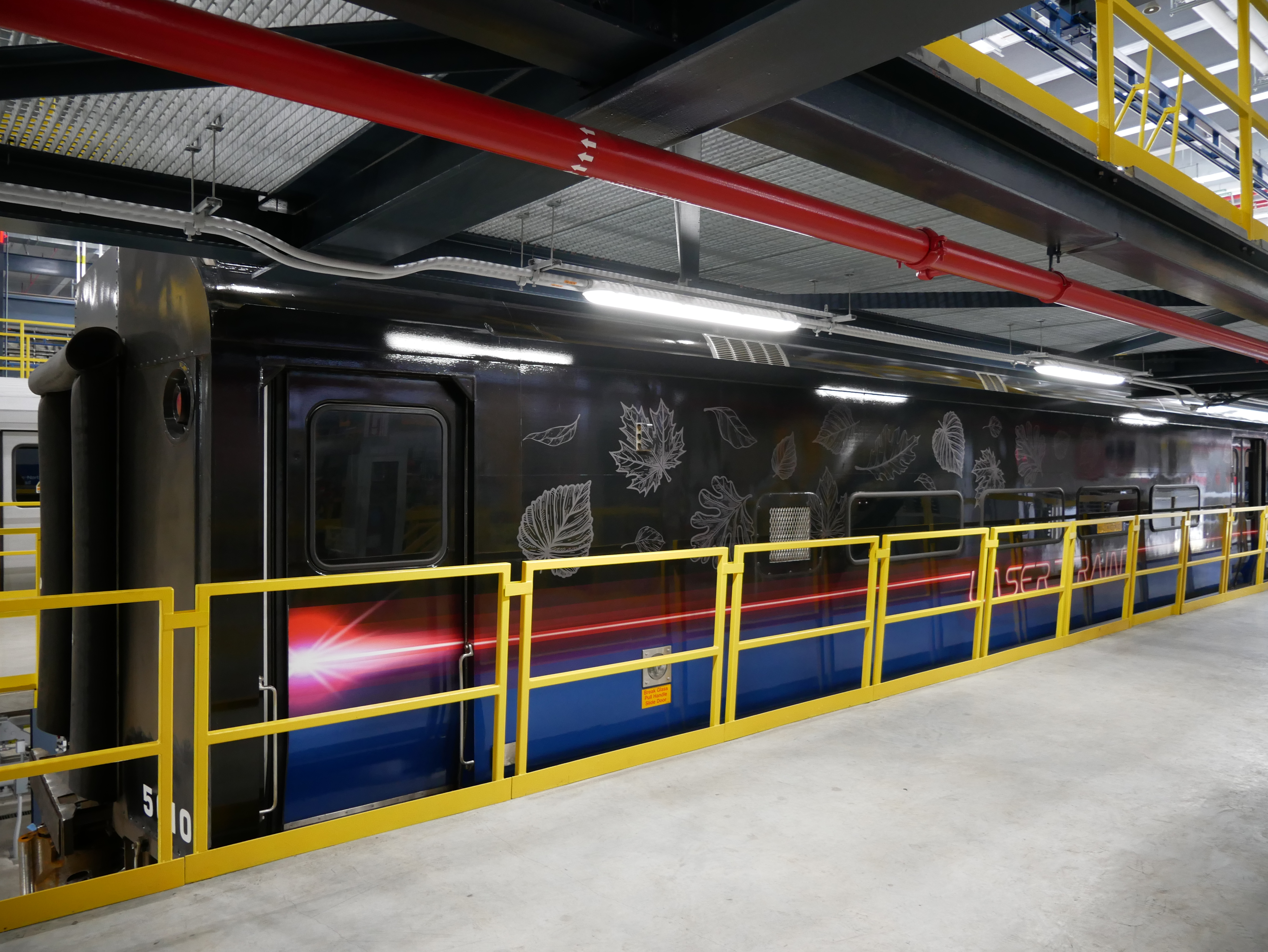
Metro-North Railroad Laser Train

Since 2018, LIRR has used laser technology provided by Laser Precision Solutions, to tackle the autumn slip slide issue, using two 25 mph (40 km/h) LaserTrains.

=== Sanders ===
Locomotives and multiple units are fitted with sanders which apply a fine layer of dry sand on the railhead. This assists adhesion during braking and acceleration.

=== Novel methods ===
There are a range of novel methods being trialed for cleaning contamination from the railhead. One method uses solid CO_{2} ("dry ice") which is fired at the track through a nozzle, removing contamination through surface cooling, kinetic energy and sublimation. Other methods have been trialed include microwave plasma and ultrasound.

=== Wheel slide protection ===
Wheel slide protection (WSP) equipment is fitted to passenger trains to manage the behaviour of wheel sets in low adhesion conditions. When the train is braking, it behaves like the ABS system in cars by releasing the brake on any axle if it detects that it is locking up. WSP can also control the traction system to prevent wheel spin when applying power.

=== Driving technique ===
Where trains have difficulty stopping during low adhesion conditions, the greatest risk is of passing a signal at danger or 'over-running' a station. At these times, train drivers adopt 'defensive driving', which involves braking earlier and more gently than usual. Also, less power is applied when starting trains.

Before each leaf-fall season, train companies may arrange low-adhesion training for newly qualified drivers. This consists of taking over a section of line during a quiet period. Using lineside markers each driver gets their train up to speed and then makes a full service brake application under normal adhesion conditions. The railhead is then treated with a contaminant that has a low coefficient of friction. On the second run, the driver will experience the sound and sensation of the train sliding, and the stopping distance will be considerably greater.

Although this provides only an approximation of how a train will behave during low adhesion, it does ensure that the driver can recognize the onset of wheel slide and will know the correct actions to take when it occurs.

In the UK, some passenger train operating companies publish a special 'leaf fall' timetable to allow for the additional time that lighter braking and acceleration take.

=== Communication ===
Any information about the location and severity of low adhesion conditions will give train drivers warning of problems. In the UK there are several sources;

- Regular blackspots, known as Areas of known low adhesion are published in the Sectional Appendix and form part of the drivers' Route Knowledge which they are examined on.
- Lineside signs showing the start and end of known regular low adhesion areas are provided at some locations.
- Drivers are required by the Rulebook, to report to the signaller immediately either, any low railhead adhesion at a location not published in the Sectional Appendix, or any exceptionally poor rail adhesion at locations which are published in the Sectional Appendix.
- After receiving a report of low adhesion conditions, the signaller will contact drivers of following trains by radio to warn them. If it is safe to do so, the signaller may tell a driver to carry out a controlled test stop. That driver will then stop the train using the brake force appropriate to normal conditions for the weather and conditions at that time of year, and report back to the signaller.

=== Vegetation management ===
Removal of deciduous trees at the lineside is a management method to control the problem; however, there is political resistance to this in populous areas.

== North America ==
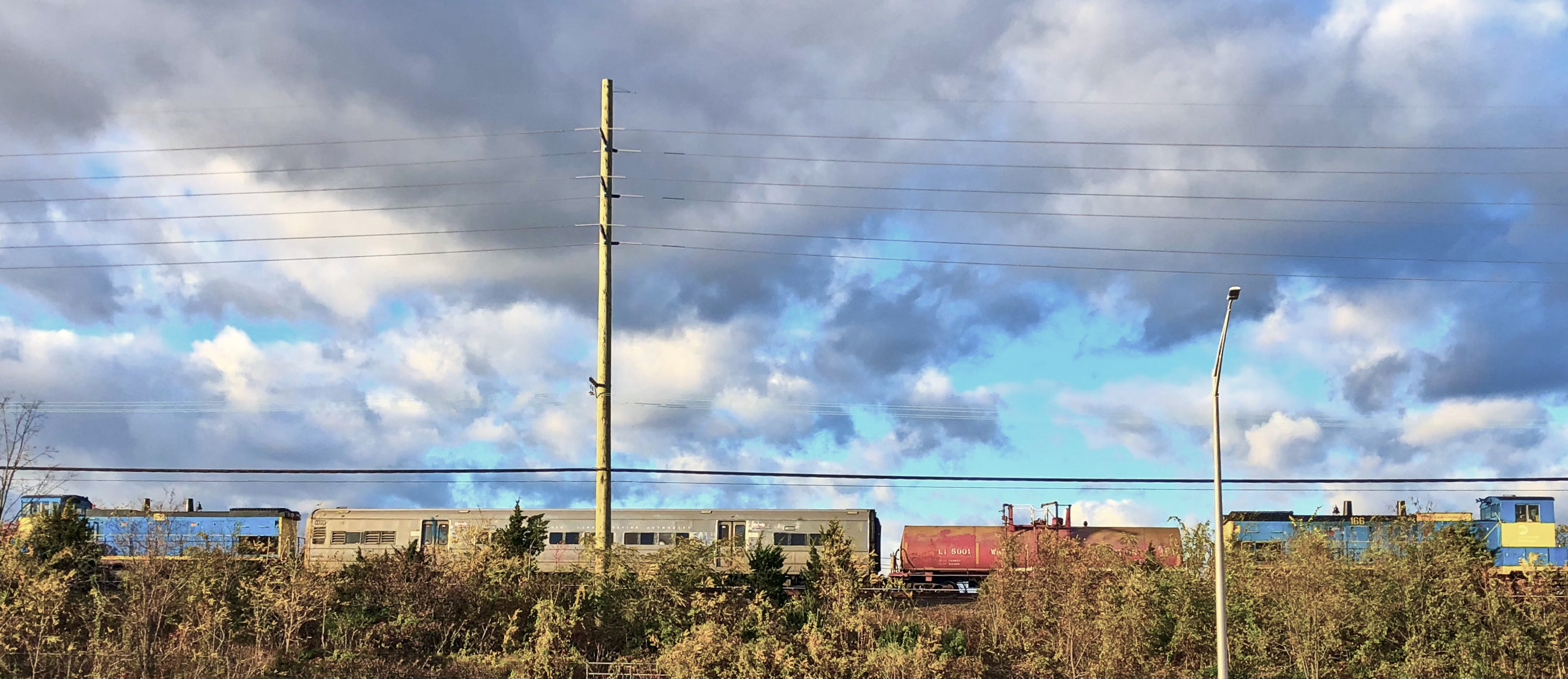
LIRR adhesion train (adhesion car is the silver/grey modified M3 car, with a red tank car to supply it) passes on the Babylon Branch in autumn to deal with leaf issues.

Slippery rail has created severe disruptions of rail service, particularly in major metropolitan areas such as New York and Boston. In November 2006, it was blamed for roughly one-third of all Metro-North Railroad's Hudson and Harlem lines' passenger cars being taken out of service. During the same period on the Long Island Rail Road, nearly 25% of cars were out of service due to slippery rail.

In the US, Amtrak, the Massachusetts Bay Transportation Authority, southeastern Pennsylvania's SEPTA, Chicago's commuter rail service Metra, and MARC, which serves Baltimore and Washington, D.C., have all reported delays due to slippery rail.

Methods for dealing with slippery rail have included trimming trees, the release of sand on the train wheels for traction, high-pressure water blasting and, most expensively, the use of high-powered laser blasts to clear the rails of leaves.

Metro-North has designed a system dubbed "Waterworld", which is a large flat rail car that blasts the rails with high-pressure water jets as the car moves over it.

New Jersey Transit has used a similar method, which has proven effective. The device it uses is called "Aqua-Track" which, while attached to a moving rail car, sprays water at a pressure of 20,000 psi (140 MPa) on to the part of the rail where the leaves cling. Since this system was introduced in 2002, the delays due to wheelslip have been reduced by over 60%.

SEPTA Regional Rail's method of preventing slippery rail is the Gel Trains. These three trains spray a high-pressure mixture of Sandite on the rails; in the fall, the Gel Trains also clean the rails using the high-pressure water jet method ahead of the gel application. These trains consist of a pressure washer and gel dispenser mounted on a converted flatcar, and a tank car which carries water. They are pulled on one end by one of SEPTA's work diesels (or a diesel borrowed from a local shortline such as the West Chester Railroad), and controlled at the other end by a former LIRR "Power Pack" cab unit (one a former ALCO FA, the other a former EMD F7). However, as of 2015; The FA and F7 were retired and replaced by Comet 1 cab cars.

== United Kingdom ==
In the United Kingdom, a number of rail companies change their timings and publish special "leaf fall timetables".

During autumn, a fleet of Railhead Treatment Trains (RHTT) run across the network using high pressure water-jetting to clean the railhead. These trains are timetabled to run between scheduled daytime services as well as during the night when less rail activity can allow the railhead contamination to build up.

The cryptic nature of rail company explanations for slippery rail and related phenomena made the phrase "leaves on the line" a standing joke, and, along with variants such as "the wrong type of snow", is seen by members of the public who are not familiar with the problem as an excuse for poor service.

Particularly problematic local trees include the sycamore, lime, sweet and horse chestnut, ash, and poplar, which regrow or coppice after cutting back, and have large, flat leaves, which stick to the line and cause severe slippery rail. Other types of tree that cause problems are quick-growing, pioneering trees, or those producing a substantial amount of leaves. Poplars are particularly troubling because they tend to shed limbs.

A term current in 2003 for cutting down or cutting back trees near the lines was "lineside vegetation management".

== Netherlands ==
Slippery rail is also a problem in the Netherlands, addressed by Nederlandse Spoorwegen (NS) and ProRail. To prevent wheel lock, on some routes trains are required to brake earlier and accelerate more slowly. Furthermore, some (passenger) trains are fitted with equipment to apply Sandite gel on the tracks. In autumn 2016, nearly 90,000 litres (24,000 US gal) of this gel was applied on the Dutch railway network. In the fall of 2014 a pilot, in collaboration with Delft University of Technology, to use lasers to remove contaminations was announced by NS and ProRail.

== See also ==
- Adhesion railway
- Sandbox (railways)
- Sandite
- Tram sanders
- Tribology
