= Wheel–rail interface =

Contact area between wheel and rail of railway

The wheel–rail interface is the area of contact between wheels and rails of railways. The interaction between wheel and rail is a specialized subject covering the design and management of the high stresses in the small contact area between a steel wheel and a steel rail. The focus is on safety improvement, maintenance and replacement costs reduction, downtime reduction, and energy and environmental management. The surface of the wheel that rests on the rail is known as the tread. A wheel may have either a single flange on the gauge side (inside) of the rail or two flanges, one on each side of the rail.
