= Railway and tramway terminology in Europe =

The following tables list railway and tramway terminology as used in different European languages. Included are English, German, Polish, Hungarian, French and Italian.

== Types of rail/cable transport service ==
UK English/ other non-US English	US English	German	Polish	Hungarian	French	Italian	Description
railway	railroad	Eisenbahn	kolej	vasút, vaspálya (archaic)	chemin de fer	ferrovia	transport on rails
mountain railway	mountain railroad	Gebirgsbahn	kolej górska	hegyi vasút			railways on mountainous terrain
rack railway, rack-and-pinion railway, cog railway	rack railroad	Zahnradbahn	kolej zębata	fogaskerekű vasút		ferrovia a cremagliera	railways assisted by a rack-and-pinion system
cable railway	cable railroad		kolej linowa				
funicular, cliff railway	funicular	Standseilbahn	funikular, kolej terenowo-linowa	siklóvasút, sikló	funiculaire	funicolare	
tram, tramway	streetcar, trolley	Straßenbahn, Trambahn	tramwaj	villamos, tramway (archaic)	tramway, tram	tram	urban railways
underground, tube, metro	subway, metro	U-bahn, Untergrundbahn, Metro	metro	metró, földalatti vasút (archaic)	métro	metropolitana	underground rail rapid transit
		S-bahn	szybka kolej miejska	gyorsvillamos			overground rail rapid transit
		Tram-Train					
regional railway			kolej regionalna	helyi érdekű vasút, HÉV			
aerial tramway	cable car	Pendelbahn		drótkötélpályás felvonó, felvonó	téléphérique		
aerial lift	aerial lift gondola lift	Seilbahn		kábelvasút, kötélvasút			
chairlift	chairlift	Sessellift	wyciąg krzesełkowy				

== Vehicles ==
UK English/ other non-US English	US English	German	Polish	Hungarian	French	Italian	Description
train	train	Zug	pociąg	vonat	train	treno	group of coupled railway vehicles
formation, rake, (Note: for carriages) set, (Note: when permanently or semipermanently coupled) unit (Note: when permanently or semipermanently coupled)	consist, trainset		skład	vonat- összeállítás			specific grouping (configuration) of coupled railway vehicles
		Rollmaterial	tabor	vasúti jármű			railway vehicle
		Triebfahrzeug (Tfz.)		vasúti vontatójármű			powered railway vehicle
locomotive (loco), engine	locomotive (loco), engine	Lokomotive (Lok)	lokomotywa	mozdony, lokomotív (archaic)	locomotive	locomotiva	powered railway vehicle without a passenger compartment
	A unit, mother						multiple unit locomotive capable of controlling (and powering) a B unit or a slug
	B unit, booster unit, cabless, slave						cabless multiple unit locomotive capable of being controlled by an A unit
	slug						cabless, remotely powered multiple unit railway vehicle capable of being powered and controlled by an A unit
shunter (UK/AU), shunting engine, yard pilot (AU)	switcher, switch engine, yard goat		lokomotywa manewrowa	tolatómozdony			locomotive intended for moving other rolling stock (shunting) on railway shunting yards
	road switcher						locomotive intended both for moving other rolling stock (shunting) on railway shunting yards and for acting as a regular locomotive outside shunting yards
multiple unit (MU)	multiple unit (MU)		zespół trakcyjny				railway vehicle capable of controlling (and powering) another railway vehicle
power car	power car	Triebkopf	wagon silnikowy	hajtófej			
	trainset	Triebzug		motorvonat			
motor coach, railcar/railmotor (non-pulling vehicle)	motorcar, railmotor, motor, box motor, doodlebug (non-pulling vehicle)	Triebwagen	wagon silnikowy, wagon motorowy	motorkocsi	autorail	automotrice	powered railway vehicle with a passenger compartment
		Gepäcktriebwagen		poggyászmotorkocsi			motor coach with a luggage compartment
control car, control trailer, driving trailer, driving van trailer (DVT)	cab car	Steuerwagen	wagon sterowniczy, wagon rozrządczy	vezérlőkocsi			
generator car, generator van	head end power car (HEP car), power car			fűtőkocsi			
brake van, guard's van	caboose	Begleitwagen, Güterzuggepäckwagen	brankard	fékezőkocsi			
travelling post office (TPO)	railway post office (RPO)		wagon pocztowy	postakocsi			
railway carriage	railroad car, railcar			vasúti kocsi			
railway coach, railway car	passenger car	Personenwagen	wagon osobowy	személykocsi			
goods wagon, freight wagon	goods car, freight car	Güterwagen	wagon towarowy	teherkocsi, tehervagon, vagon			
	boxcar			teherkocsi, tehervagon			
	flatcar			pőrekocsi			
refrigerated van, refrigerated wagon	refrigerator car, reefer			hűtőkocsi, hűtővagon			
tank wagon, tanker wagon	tank car			tartálykocsi			
railbus		Schienenautobus, Schienenbus	autobus szynowy, szynobus	sínautóbusz, sínbusz	autocar sur rails	autobus su rotaia	
		Straßenbahnzug		villamosszerelvény			
tramcar	streetcar, trolley car			villamoskocsi			
tram engine				tramway (archaic)			
underground car	subway car			metrókocsi			
articulated motor coach		Gelenktriebwagen		csuklós motorkocsi			articulated motor coach
trailer		Beiwagen, Anhanger		pótkocsi, pót			unpowered, towed tram vehicle
		Triebbeiwagen, geführter Triebwagen		motorpótkocsi, motorpót			

== See also ==
- Glossary of rail transport terms
- Glossary of United Kingdom railway terms
- Glossary of North American railway terms
- Glossary of Australian railway terms
- Glossary of New Zealand railway terms
- Passenger rail terminology
