= Glossary of Australian railway terms =

Railway terminology used in Australia

This article lists some of the terminology used at present and in the past by Australian railway employees, contractors, railway historians and railway enthusiasts. Many of the terms appear from time to time in specialist, rail-related publications.

Significant regional variations have existed, indicated when applicable in this glossary by abbreviations of the state (e.g. Vic, NSW) or railway (e.g. SAR). Throughout Australia, much terminology has persisted since the colonial period, when British technology predominated. In the case of the former South Australian Railways, however, many North American terms and practices were introduced during the incumbency of William Alfred Webb, the American railways commissioner of the SAR between 1922 and 1930. SAR employees' enthusiasm for US railroad developments perpetuated these terms.

== B ==
Bandicoot (Qld)
An electric multiple unit (EMU), Brisbanes first generation of electric trains, with a distinctive grey band painted across the cab wind shields
Banjo or scoop (SAR)
Fireman's shovel
Barwell's bull (SAR)
Model 55 Brill railcar (nickname from the South Australian premier 1920–1924, Henry Barwell; "bull" may have originated in the characteristic deep "bellow" of the railcar's horn
Basket (SAR)
Basket of coal (measurement: 25 baskets to the ton)
BETY (Qld)
QR BB18 1/4 class Pacific type (4-6-2) steam locomotive used on express passenger and freight trains (named after the telegraphic code; pronounced "Betty")
Bleed (SAR)
Drain the air from the brake reservoir of a train or a rail vehicle
Blister (SAR)
Official serious caution
Block (SAR)
See rabbit
Blood and bone (Vic)
Livery used by V/Line
Blue babies (Qld)
QR DD17 class suburban tank engine, in a blue midway between navy and sky blue
Blue Goose (NSW)
Livery used by the PTC in NSW found on B, S, V and W sets, and Tulloch trailers
Bluebird (SAR)
South Australian Railways 100/250/280 class country-lines diesel railcar, which had blue and stainless-steel sides and bore the names of birds
Bowser (SAR)
Switchstand
Boxcar (SAR)
Enclosed bogie vehicle (e.g. M, DW class etc boxcar)
Brass (SAR)
Railway official
Brill (SAR)
Model 55 or Model 75 Brill railcars
Broad gauge (all jurisdictions)
1600 mm (5 ft 3 in) gauge in the states of Victoria and South Australia (and for a short time, Tasmania)
Brown bomber (Qld)
A QR C17 4-8-0 (2D) steam engine, typically painted brown
Button up (SAR)
Connect air hoses and open air taps (see "Make good")
B.V. (SAR)
Brakevan

== C ==
Caboose (SAR)
U.S.-style brakevan without passenger accommodation, with cupola in the centre; sometimes referred to as "Webb caboose"
Candy (NSW)
Red, black and yellow livery used widely by the New South Wales State Rail Authority
Cannonball crew / top engine crew (SAR)
Cannonball Link crews that worked The Overland, East-West Express and other express trains
Captain/skipper (SAR)
Guard
Car (SAR)
Rail vehicle (passenger, freight or service)
Centralised traffic control (all jurisdictions)
A system in which signals and switches for a given area of track are controlled from a centralised location (abbreviated as CTC)
Cheeseburger (Vic)
V/Line Mk 3 Livery (2008–2017), which featured the colours red, white and yellow.
Conductor (all jurisdictions)
The person who checks (and may sell) tickets on a train or tram
Connie (SAR)
Conductor
Compo (SAR)
Guards van with passenger compartment each end (short for "composite")
Consist (SAR) (Note: Pronounced CON-sist.)
The make-up of a train; a list containing specific information for each car of a train; also a group of locomotives (see also Rake)
Corner shunt (SAR)
Bumping a vehicle or vehicles standing foul into the clear when running on an adjacent line
Corrie (SAR)
Correspondence, especially for trainworking
Creamy Kate (NSW)
Colloquial name for NSW Rail Motor No.38
Cripple (SAR)
Red or green carder (rail vehicle with a red card or green card)
Cyclops (Qld)
A Queensland electric multiple unit with one cab modified to only have one central windshield, which can then only be used as a guard's cab in the middle of a six-car set

== D ==
DERM (Vic)
Victorian Railways diesel electric rail motor
Detonator (DET) (all jurisdictions)
A small explosive device placed on rail and triggered by wheel pressure, used to warn of a hazard ahead
Dog or dogspike (all jurisdictions)
A rail spike driven into a timber sleeper to secure a rail; the head shape facilitates extraction with hand tools
Dogbox (Qld)
Non-driving cab of the QR electric multiple unit with one centre windshield, used as a guards compartment (see Cyclops)
Doggies (Vic)
Former "dog box" type red suburban trains
Dolly
A shunting signal
Dolly Varden (SAR)
4400 class composite (guard, freight and passengers) brakevan (Note: Dolly Varden is a character in Charles Dickens's 1841 novel, Barnaby Rudge.)
Dope (SAR)
Special water treatment for steam locomotives
Drag (SAR)
Long wayside freight train

== E ==
Electric staff (all jurisdictions)
See staff
Electric multiple unit (EMU) (Qld)
A class of electric multiple unit suburban train in Brisbane
Evans set (Qld)
Wooden suburban passenger carriages in Brisbane

== F ==
Fender (SAR)
Wagon between loco and wagons for separation of dangerous goods or because of incompatible couplers
Flat (SAR)
Flatcar – e.g. four-wheeled (F class) or bogie (FB, FBT class)
Foamer
Slang for a rather obsessive rail or tramway enthusiast
Foul (SAR)
Obstruction by a vehicle that is not sufficiently clear of an adjacent line or switch/turnout
Freight (SAR)
Goods; alternatively, freight train
Full jigger (SAR)
Full load

== G ==
Gabby (Vic)
A train spotter who photographs Melbourne suburban electric trains, especially Hitachi electric multiple units
Gondola or "gonny" (SAR)
An OB class open bogie freight car
G.B. (SAR)
Goods brake[van]
Green carder (SAR)
Vehicle in need of repair but can be operated (see red carder)
Guard (all jurisdictions)
Crew member responsible for the safe and proper operation of the train
Gunzel (Vic)
A rail or tramway enthusiast, especially of the more obsessive kind

== H ==
Harris (Vic)
Former Victorian Railways Harris type (or Blue) electric suburban train.

High flyer (NSW)
NSWGR Z15 and Z16 class locomotive

== I ==
In the ditch (SAR)
Derailed

== K ==
Katie (NSW)
NSWGR D55 class locomotive – most probably derived from original class numbering, KT

== L ==
Ladder (SAR)
A major track through a yard
Lamp (all jurisdictions)
A portable (often handheld) light source that is used to signal train crews; former kerosene-fuelled light on signals
L.C.L. (SAR)
Less-than-car-load freight

== M ==
Make good (Vic, NSW)
Connect air hoses and open air taps (see "Button up")
Mustard pot (SAR)
Traffic yellow (bright orange), red oxide and silver colour scheme of SAR 830 class diesel locomotives, and some 600 class, before AN take-over, or one of such locomotives

== N ==
Nanny (NSW)
NSW C.35 Class locomotive – probably derived from original class numbers NN
Narrow gauge (all jurisdictions)
Most commonly 1067 mm (3 ft 6 in) gauge in the states of Queensland, South Australia, Tasmania and Western Australia; also sugar cane lines of 762 millimetres (2 feet 6 inches) and 610 millimetres (2 feet 0 inches) gauge
Number nicker or number shark (Vic)
A trainspotter who records numbers of trains they have seen

== O ==
On the mat (SAR)
To be subject to official discipline
Oscar (NSW)
NSW TrainLink H set, a class of electric train with "outer suburban carriages"

== P ==
Pain (SAR)
(To be rostered for) a freight shift
Pawpaw
Queensland Railways class 1170 diesel locomotive, or its colour
Peg (all jurisdictions)
Colloquial term for train staff or token
Petrol electric rail motor (PERM) (Vic)
A railmotor operated by the Victorian Railways; later called the Diesel Electric Rail Motor
P.I.C. (SAR)
Porter in charge (person in charge of a station that does not justify a stationmaster)
Pig (NSW)
NSW C36 class locomotive
Plastic Fantastic (NSW)
NSW XPT (Express Passenger Train) when new
Provisional stopping place (SAR)
Place shown on public timetables at which a passenger either signals a train to stop or, if on board, asks the guard beforehand (see also Rail motor stopping place)
Pull the pin (SAR)
Finish the work for a shift

== R ==
Rabbit/block (SAR)
A derail
Rail motor stopping place (RMSP) (Vic)
A short platform on a Victorian country line specifically for picking up and setting down rail motor passengers (see also Provisional stopping place)
Rake/string/cut (SAR)
Several rail vehicles coupled together (see Consist)
Rattler (Qld)
Colloquial term for former wooden suburban passenger carriages ("Evans sets") in Brisbane
Rattler (SAR)
Fast freight
Red carder (SAR)
Vehicle in need of repair and cannot be operated (see green carder)
Red Hen (SAR)
South Australian Railways 300 or 400 class suburban-lines diesel railcar
Red Rattler (NSW)
First-generation single-deck electrical multiple units which operated in Sydney from 1926 to 1993
Red Rattler (Vic)
Melbourne suburban passenger "Tait" electric multiple units that ran in Melbourne from 1909 to 1984
Reefer/cool car (SAR)
Refrigerator car (later labelled "insulated van"), four-wheeled or bogie
Ridgy (NSW)
Sydney Trains S, C and K sets
Ringmaster (SAR)
Nickname for Yardmaster

== S ==
Screw the anchor on (SAR)
Set the hand brakes
Set-up (SAR)
Specific orders for placement of rolling stock
Silver ribbon (Vic)
Hitachi suburban electric multiple units, also known as "tea cup"
Snapper (Qld)
Roaming employee who checks tickets on trains or at stations (see also Conductor)
Spark (all jurisdictions)
A suburban electric train
Spragger (SAR)
Employee who applies brakes on rolling stock in yard work
Staff
System of safe-working used on single track to allow the movement of trains; in its simplest form each block section had a small bar or staff which must be carried by any train moving over the section. This, however, requires trains to run alternately in opposite directions. With the electric staff system, there are several staffs to each block, and these are placed in cases at either end. The cases are electrically connected, each one controlled by the signalman at the other end.
Steel set (Qld)
QR suburban electric passenger sets from the 1960s, replacing the Evans sets (see Red rattler (Qld))
Stick (SAR and others)
Signal
Sweat set (NSW)
Sydney Trains S set, so named because of their lack of air conditioning.
Silver stripes/silver ribbons
Livery that V/Line used in its formative years; original from VicRail
Swinger (SAR)
Freight vehicle fitted with bogies suitable for higher-speed passenger operation, such as an RBP class Reefer/cool car

== T ==
Tangara (NSW)
Officially used name for Sydney Trains T set, a class of electric suburban train in Sydney
Tin hare (NSW, SAR)
NSW: CPH class rail motor; SAR: model 55 Brill railcar
Twix
Two trains on the same mainline
Teacup (Vic)
Livery used by VicRail, also known as "silver ribbon"
Tommy Dodd (SAR)
Dwarf signal

== U ==
Uniform gauge (Qld)
1435 mm (4 ft 8 1/2 in) gauge, known elsewhere (and in Queensland) as standard gauge

== V ==
Van (SAR)
Guard's van (brakevan) or enclosed four-wheeled rail vehicle (e.g. DA, DWF class) (see Boxcar)

== W ==
White set (Qld)
A Queensland Railways long-distance train with livery from the 1950s
Waratah (NSW)
Sydney Trains A and B set electric multiple unit that operated in Sydney

== X ==
Xtrap (Vic)
X'Trapolis 100 electric multiple unit that operates in Melbourne

== Y ==
Yard goat (SAR)
Yard shunt locomotive

== See also ==
- Glossary of rail transport terms
- Glossary of New Zealand railway terms
- Glossary of North American railway terms
- Glossary of United Kingdom railway terms
- Passenger rail terminology
