= Railfan =

Rail transport enthusiast

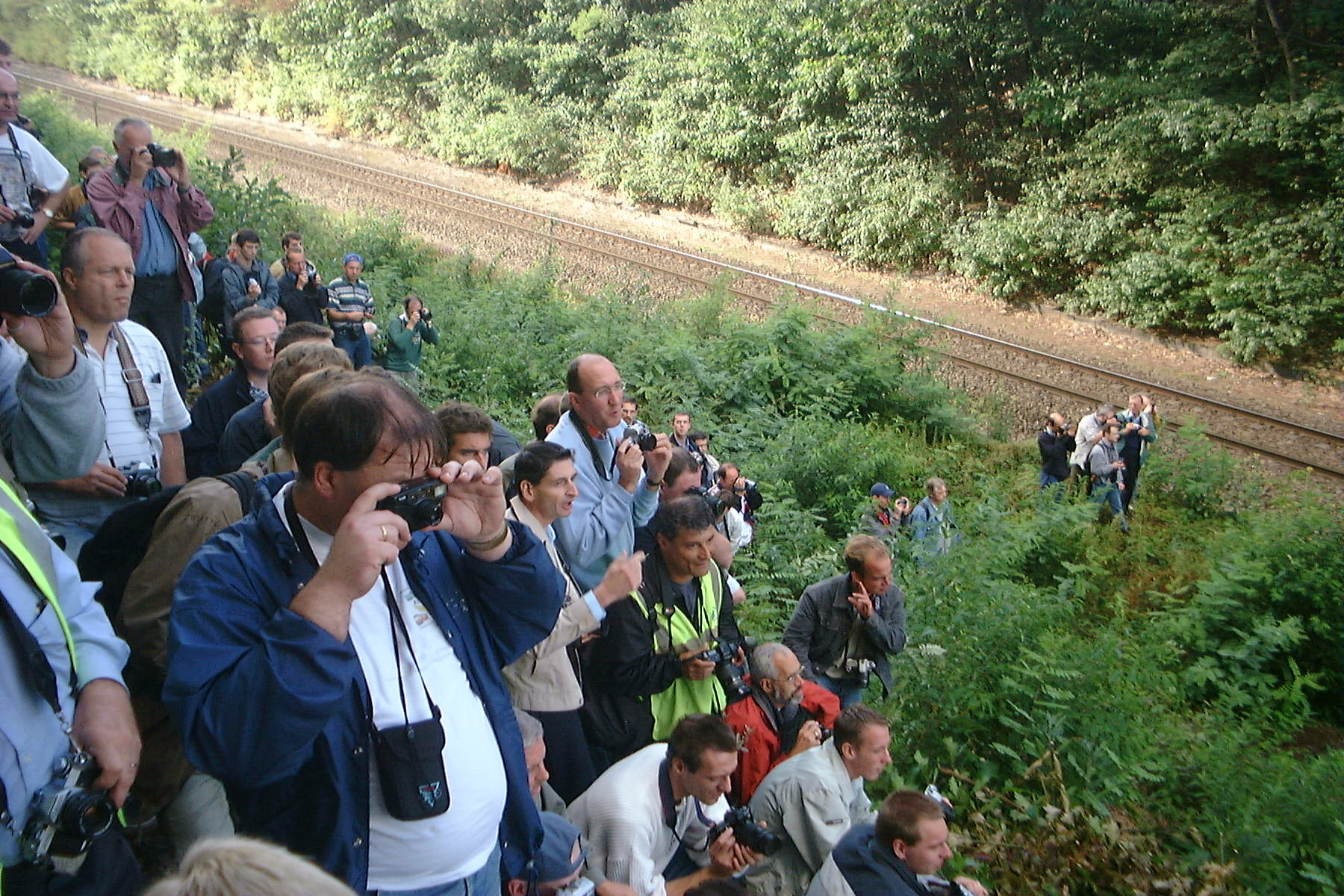
Railfan photographers in Belgium in September 2003, at the farewell of the NMBS/SNCB Class 51 locomotive

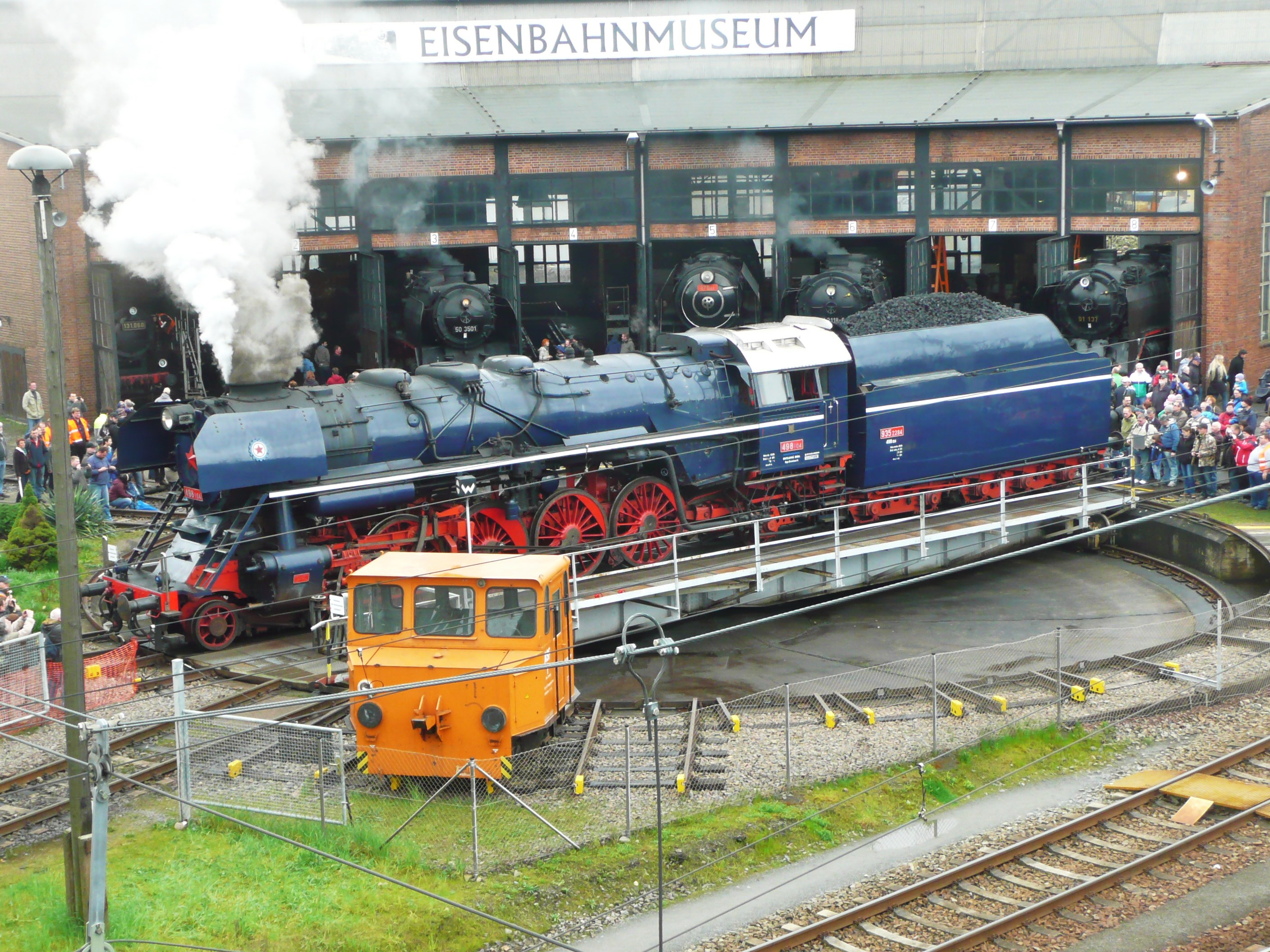
Preserved steam locomotive ČSD 498.104 at a festival in Dresden railway museum

A railfan, train fan, rail buff, train enthusiast, or train buff (American English), railway enthusiast, railway buff, anorak (British English), gunzel (Australian English), trainspotter (British English) or ferroequinologist is a person who is recreationally interested in trains and rail transport systems.

Railfans often combine their interest with other hobbies, especially photography and videography, radio scanning, railway modelling, studying railroad history and participating in railway station and rolling stock preservation efforts. There are many magazines and websites dedicated to railfanning and railway enthusiasts, including Trains, Railfan & Railroad, The Railway Magazine, Locomotive Magazine and Railway Gazette International.

== Other names ==
In the United Kingdom, rail enthusiasts are often called trainspotters or anoraks. The term gricer has been used in the UK since at least 1969 and is said to have been current in 1938 amongst members of the Manchester Locomotive Society, according to the Oxford English Dictionary. There has been speculation that the term derives from "grouser", one who collects dead grouse after a shoot, but other etymologies have also been suggested.

In Australia, they are sometimes referred to as "gunzels".

In Japan rail enthusiasts are known as densha otaku, although numerous terms exist to describe activities falling within the category including Toritetsu for fans of photographing and/or filming trains, Nori-tetsu (people who enjoy travelling by train) and Eki-tetsu (enthusiasts of train station architecture).

In the United States, they can be referred to pejoratively as "foamers". There is a dispute over the origin of this term. Some cite the extensive use of styrofoam to create scenery and landscaping in model railroad building, while others trace its origins to the related term "Foamite" (which stands for "Far Out And Mentally Incompetent Train Enthusiast") or claim it refers to "the notion of foaming-at-the-mouth craziness" in a manner similar to rabid animals.

"Ferroequinologist" derives from ferroequus, a New Latin calque of "iron horse" (the oft-used nickname for early steam locomotives).

== Activities ==
A train parade on a railway test circuit in Moscow, Russia. Railfans taking photos and videos of rolling stock

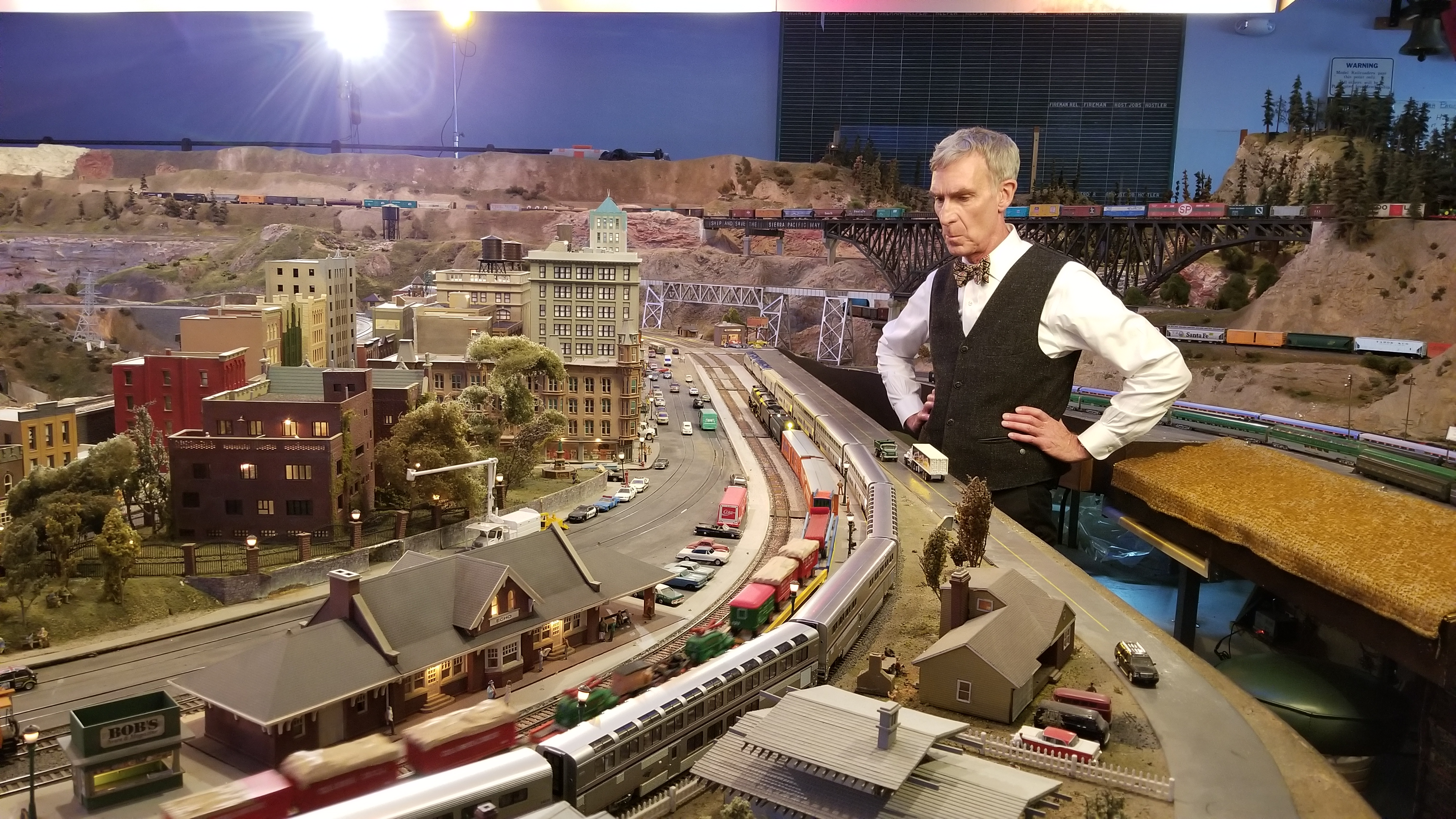
Bill Nye looks over the model railroad display at the Pasadena, California model train club

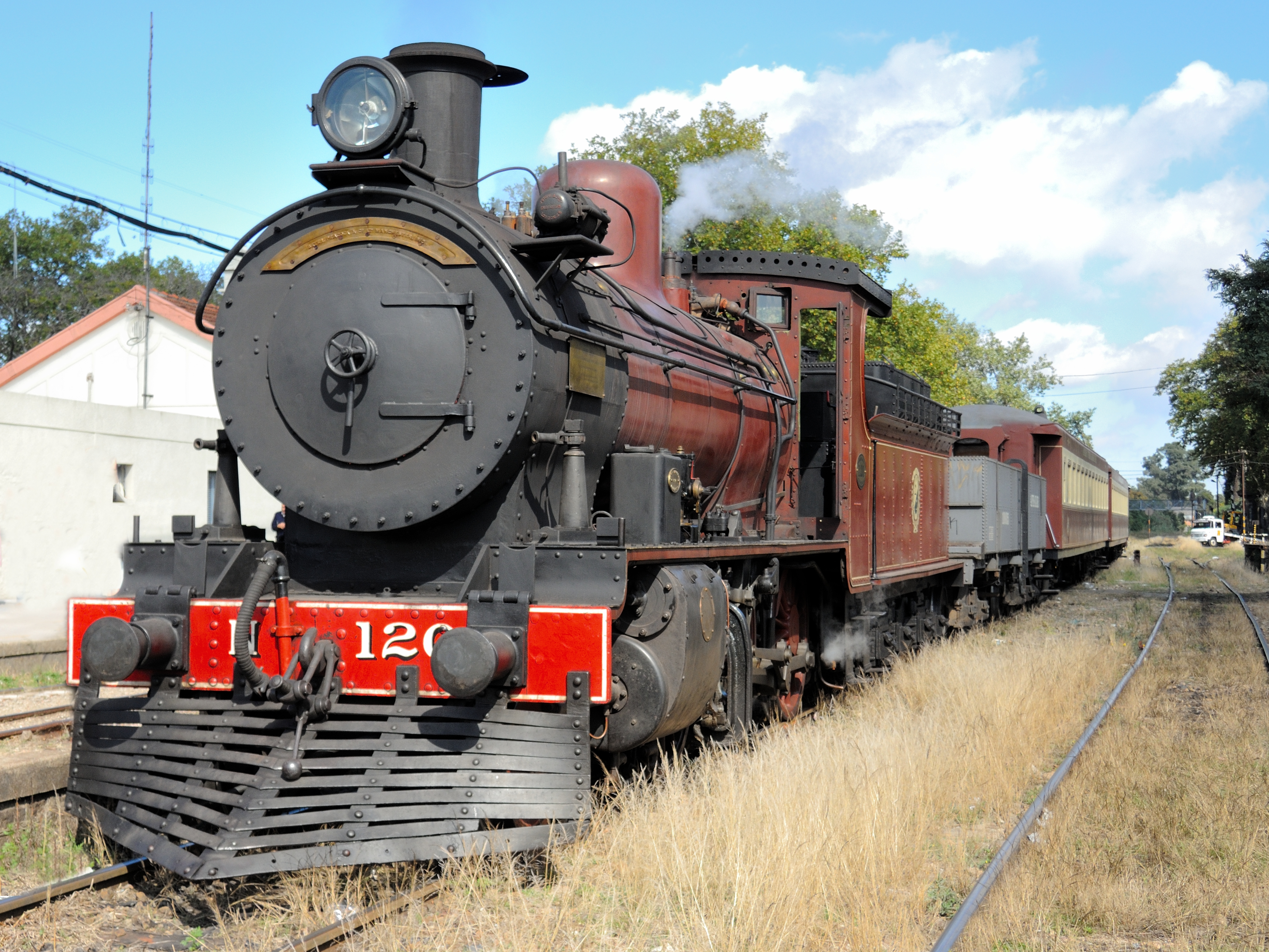
Steam locomotive hauling a rail fan train for the Uruguayan Railfan Association

The hobby extends to all aspects of rail transport systems. Railfans may have one or more particular concentrations of interest, such as:

- Railway locomotives and rolling stock
- Still-used or disused railroad lines, bridges, tunnels, stations, signal boxes and other infrastructure
- Subways and other local rail transit systems
- Railway history
- Railway photography
- Railway books and magazines
- Railtours
- Railway signalling
- Playing train simulators
- Railway modelling, both physical and virtual model railroading, toy train collecting, live steam and outdoor miniature railways, and model engineering.
- Collection of railway artifacts, in particular: tickets, timetables, posters, railway paper, route maps, locomotive whistles, number plates, builder's plates, builder's photos, badges, uniforms, railway crockery and other railwayana. Many items, such as timetables and railway paper (i.e. internal railway documents), are collected for study and not just as collectibles.
- Railway art or architecture
- Railway operations, economics or commerce
- Railway advocacy and politics relating to railways
- Railway preservation/restoration
- Level crossings and their infrastructure. This is where the railfan can also be interested in the railroad or "grade" crossing signals.
- Monitoring railroad radio communications with a radio scanner.

The scope of the subject is so large that fans may additionally concentrate their interest on a particular country, town, railway company, field of operations or era in history – or a combination of any of the above.

=== Railway photography ===
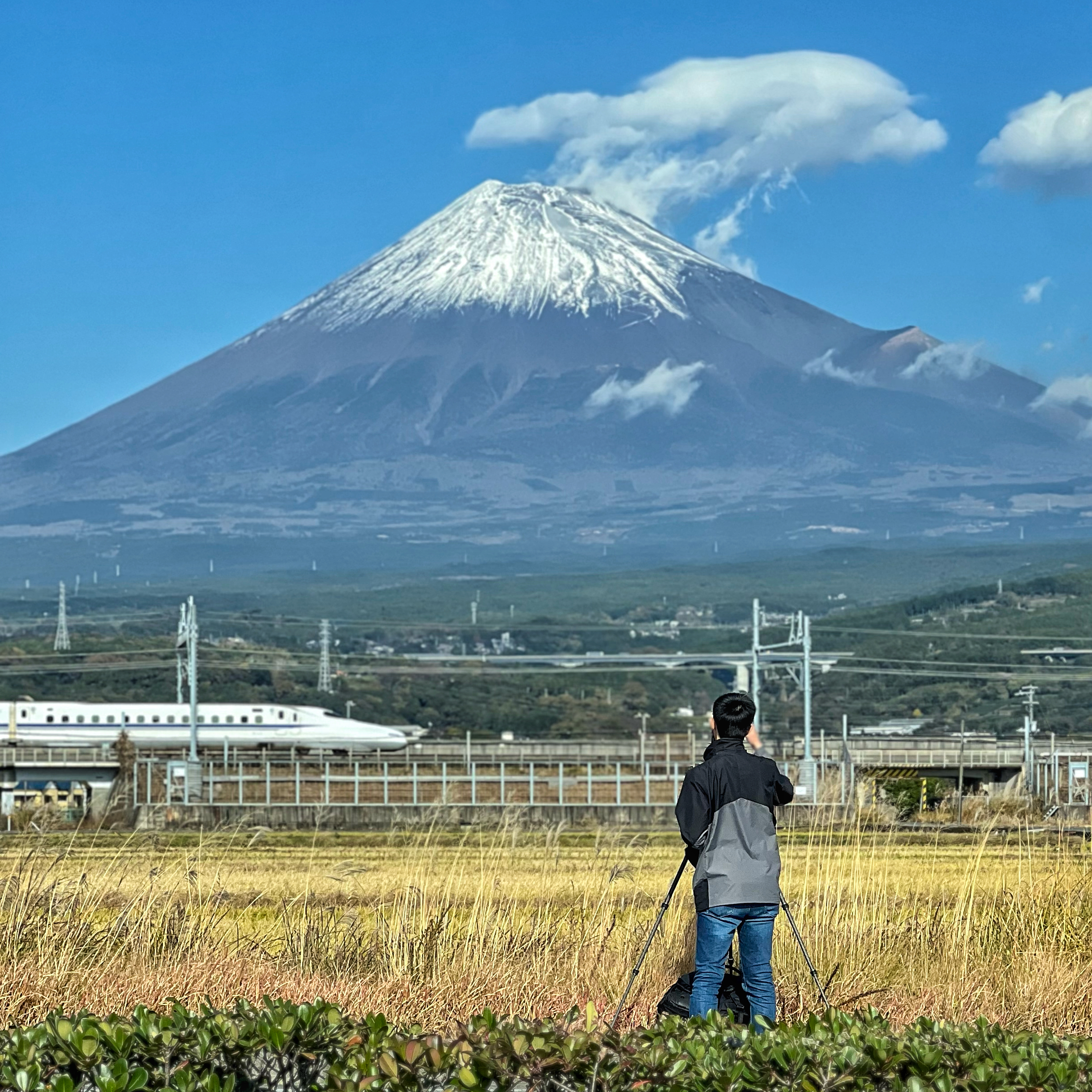
A trainspotter photographing an N700 Series Shinkansen on the Tokaido Shinkansen line near Mount Fuji

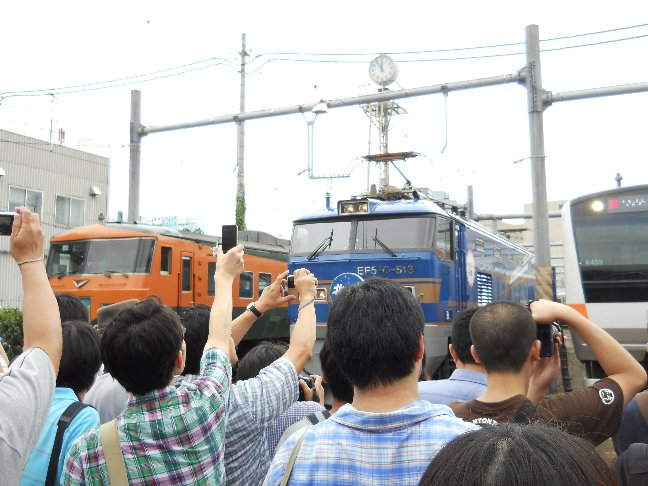
Railfans taking train photos at the Japan Railways Group (JR) Tokyo train center

Train photography is a common activity of railfans. Most railfans do their photographing from public property, unless they have permission to use a specific private property owner's land. Occasionally, they run into problems with law enforcement, especially due to post 9/11 security concerns, because they are sometimes viewed as suspicious. In 2004, for example, the New York City Subway attempted to institute a photo ban, which was met with fierce opposition and ultimately scrapped. In sharp contrast, the Port Authority Trans–Hudson (PATH) successfully implemented a photo ban that is still in effect (although it predated the 11 September attacks and the 1993 World Trade Center bombing); it has led to confiscations and arrests on the PATH system.

- In the United Kingdom, photography is allowed at all stations on the National Rail network. Transport for London, however, does not allow photography without permission and a permit issued by the TfL Film Office. However, photography for personal use, without ancillary equipment is allowed without a permit. The Tyne & Wear Metro previously prohibited all photography without written permission from Nexus, the system's operators. Personal filming photography is now allowed without a permit.
- In Singapore, private photography is allowed at any one time, except those on movie productions or wedding photoshoots, they may need approval from the public transport operators' offices.
- Spanish railroad company Renfe used to ask for a permit, but since 2018 it is not needed.
- In Greece, railway photography is permitted on all networks
- In Russia, railway photography is permitted on all networks
- In Italy, the Royal Decree n°1161 enacted on 11 July 1941, concerning "military secrets", prohibited all and any photographs and video recordings in and around a number of civilian and military installations, including public railways. Railway photography was largely tolerated by tacit agreement, but could be prosecuted as a felony. The law was repealed by Legislative Decree n°66 enacted on 15 March 2010.
- In Germany, Deutsche Bahn allows non-commercial photography as long as no additional equipment such as tripods are used.
- In Indonesia, Kereta Api Indonesia allows photography on a train station and inside the train as long as it is for private use, on a public area and without ancillary equipment such as tripod and drones. Such equipment must have additional permission from the station master or operating divisions' public relations.

=== Trainspotting ===
A trainspotter may use a data book listing the locomotives or equipment in question, in which locomotives seen are ticked off. An early trainspotter was 14-year-old Fanny Gordon, who in 1861 recorded the names of locomotives passing Westbourne Park station on the Great Western Main Line. The hobby is referenced in Edith Nesbit's 1905 children's book The Railway Children. In Great Britain, this aspect of the hobby was given a major impetus by the publication from 1942 onward of the Ian Allan "ABC" series of booklets, whose publication began in response to public requests for information about the locomotives of the Southern Railway. This category of railfan is cited in a chapter of 1993 Irvine Welsh's novel of the same name, which the title of the book, as well as the cult film released three years later, is named after.

=== Railway trips ===
==== Bashing ====
In general terms, bashing, a term used by British railway enthusiasts, describes a trip, excursion or holiday primarily involving train travel, usually with the intention of collecting mileage on a train or for covering unexplored parts of the rail network.

The practice of bashing dates back to the decline of steam locomotive operations, when more passionate trainspotters wished to note which steam engines they had travelled behind. Following the withdrawal of mainline steam in 1968, a new generation of bashers took to accumulating mileage behind diesel locomotives; the variety of diesel types, destinations to travel behind them, and the pursuit of clearing classes all fuelled the popularity of bashing. Today, despite the majority of British trains being formed of multiple units, bashing still remains a popular pastime for railway enthusiasts.

"Shed bashing" describes going out to as many railway sheds or depots as possible. It was very popular in the 1950s and 1960s. As they required a permit that could be hard to obtain, some "shed bashers" were illegal.

==== Fantrips ====
Railfans taking video of a moving restored train with steam locomotives during a fantrip taken in their auto

Many railway preservation groups run special trips for railfans using restored trains, often on "rare mileage" lines that do not see regular passenger service. These trips are both social events and opportunities for railfans to photograph unusual trains. Chasing a fantrip by road for the purposes of photography is often referred to as "motorcading" in Australia.

=== Other activities ===
Some enthusiasts combine their interest in trains with the hobby of monitoring radio communications, specializing in listening to radio communications of railroad operations using a scanner. In some busy rail corridors, local governments have budgeted, constructed and maintain railfan viewing platforms, sometimes part of a park area or nearby rail museum, which they promote along with other tourist attractions. Examples include the Folkston Railfan Platform in Folkston, Georgia, USA, where viewers can see Florida freight traffic and Amtrak passenger trains including the Auto Train, and Rochelle Railroad Park in Rochelle, Illinois at the site of a major crossing of two rail lines.

In some democratic countries, such as Canada, many railfans advocate politically for expanded railway infrastructure and promote civic engagement that encourages further development of railways.

== Safety ==
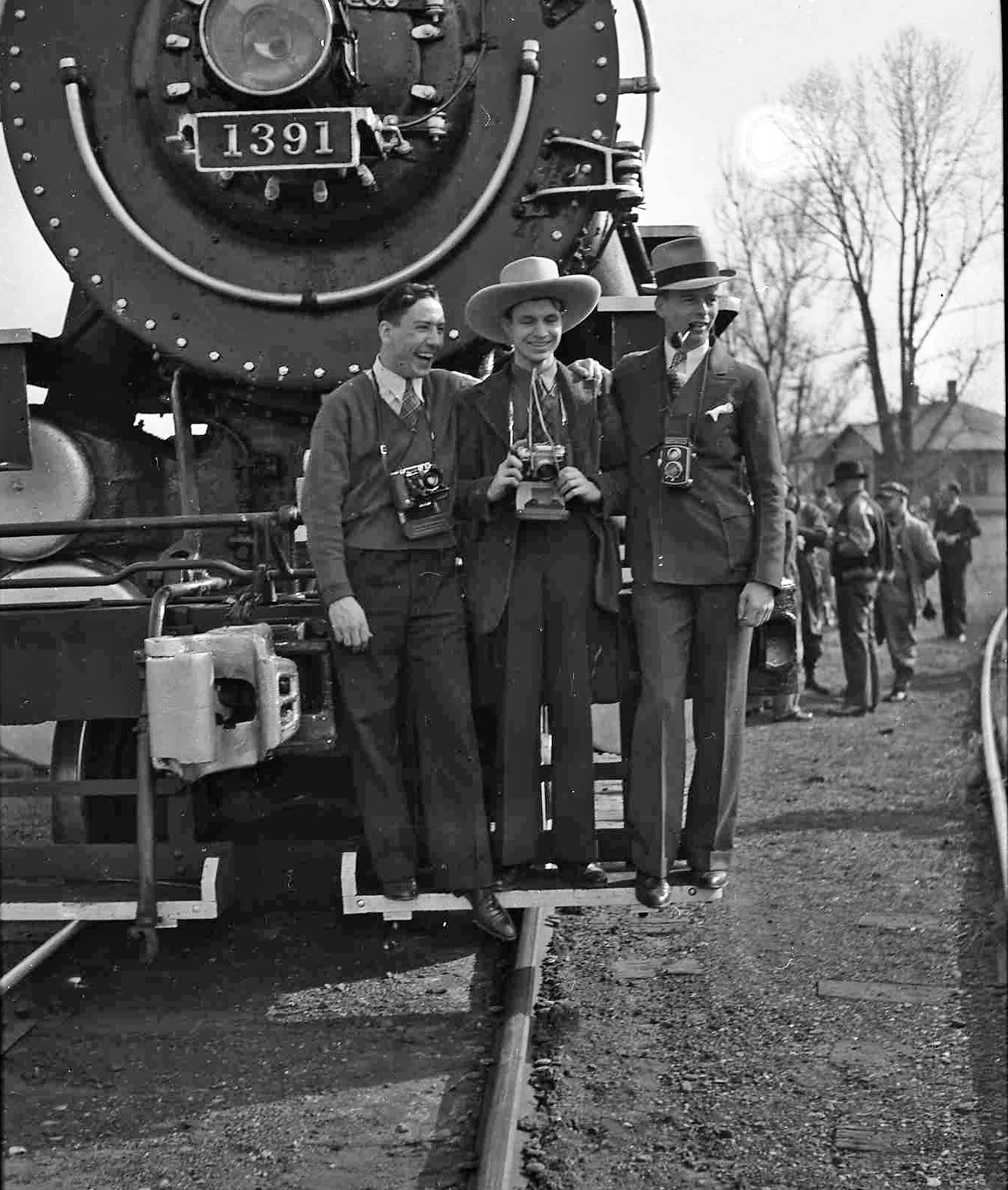
Railfans on a 1939 camera excursion train in the U.S. state of Ohio

Owing to their presence at stations and near other areas of rail infrastructure, railfans have sometimes been requested to aid railways and legal authorities alike in observing and reporting safety breaches and incidents of crime. BNSF has asked railfans in the US to keep railroad areas safer by reporting crimes and suspicious activity.

In the United Kingdom the British Transport Police have asked trainspotters to report any unusual behaviour and activities at stations.

In the United States, concerns about terrorism have led to situations where railfans are followed or confronted by local law enforcement or transit police. This has also led to situations where certain transportation agencies (such as Port Authority Trans–Hudson; PATH) have implemented photography bans systemwide.

A railfan was a factor in the 2008 Chatsworth train collision, as the engineer responsible for the accident had been distracted by texting the railfan while in charge of his train, eventually causing it to pass a signal at danger and crash into an oncoming Union Pacific freight train, killing 25 and injuring 135 others.

BNSF instituted the "Citizens for Rail Security" (CRS) program for the general public to report suspicious activities on their railways. Obtaining this card was common for railfans and is a derivative of the BNSF "On Guard" program for employees. However, this card does not recognize members as employees or contractors, asks them to keep off railway property, and is no longer obtainable. Amtrak offers a similar program, "Partners for Amtrak Safety and Security" (PASS).

In Japan, toritetsu have been frequently criticised for their behaviour when photographing trains, including incidents of vandalism and trespassing into restricted areas to set up cameras, destruction of lineside property and plants to clear a view of the track, stealing goods to sell on to fund expensive cameras, theft of railway equipment, being rude towards station staff and train drivers, physical assault, and attempting to intimidate passengers and road users for inadvertently interfering with their activities.

Network Rail, the British rail infrastructure owner and station operator, has produced guidelines for the behaviour and responsibilities of railway enthusiasts at its stations. In May 2010, the dangers of acting carelessly in the vicinity of an active railway were highlighted after an enthusiast, standing immediately next to a double track line photographing the Oliver Cromwell, failed to notice a Bombardier Turbostar express train approaching at ~70 mph (112 km/h) on the nearer track in the other direction, and came within inches of being struck by it.

== See also ==
- Railway engineering, the professional study of railways
- Anorak (slang)
- List of railroad-related periodicals
- Rail terminology
- Rail transport modelling
- Railway enthusiasts societies in the United Kingdom
- RR (2007 railfan film by James Benning)
- Sensible Train Spotting, the world's first computer train spotting simulator
- The Station Agent, 2003 film starring Peter Dinklage as a railfan who inherits a train station.
- Train whistle
- Trainspotters in the United Kingdom
- Tracks Ahead

=== Similar hobbies ===
- Aircraft spotting
- Bus spotting
- Car spotting
- Ship watching
- Gongoozlers, enthusiasts of canals in the United Kingdom
- Roadgeek
- Fire buffs, enthusiasts of firefighting and emergency services

=== Glossaries ===
- Glossary of North American railway terms
- Glossary of Australian railway terms
- Glossary of United Kingdom railway terms
- Glossary of New Zealand railway terms

== Sources ==
- Kisor, Henry (1994). Zephyr: Tracking a Dream Across America. Holbrook, Massachusetts: Adams Publishing Group. ISBN 1-55850-477-X.
- Heritage Railway. No. 122. March–April 2009.
