= Glossary of New Zealand railway terms =

This is a list of jargon commonly used by railfans and railway employees in New Zealand.

== B ==
Blue Rattlers
ADK class on the Auckland suburban network
Blue Streaks
Three NZR RM class 88 seater railcars renovated for a fast service between Hamilton and Auckland

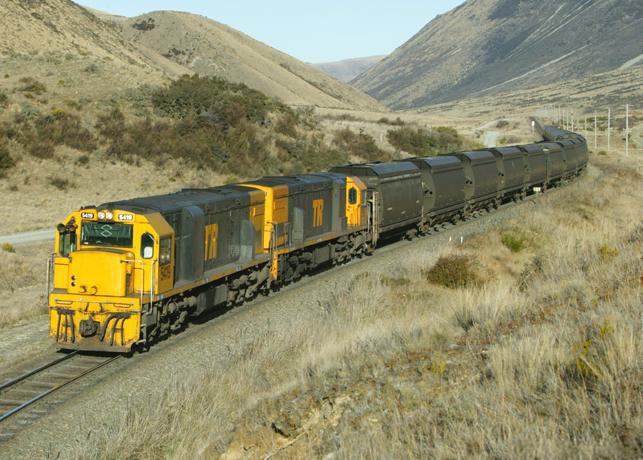
Tranz Rail Bumble-Bee livery

Bumble-Bee
Yellow and black Tranz Rail livery. Introduced on DC 4323 in 2001 after the Makihi collision, and officially named 'Hi-Viz'. Originally all locos were to have the Tranz Rail winged logo, but most carried 'TR' block letters on the long hood and several locos did not carry any branding (No Name). Bumble-bee livery was a term promoted by the past editor of NZ Railfan magazine.
Bobtails
A nickname mostly used for the W^{W} class but according to Nelson section crew the W^{F} class was also called such name.
Bush tramway
New Zealand term for an industrial tramway.

== C ==
Carvan
Passenger carriage with a guard's compartment at one end, classes A^{F} (wooden body) and A^{L} (steel body). Originally built to relieve a shortage of guard's vans and used on rural branch lines in place of a separate carriage and guard's van, the later A^{L} carvans were used in suburban service only.

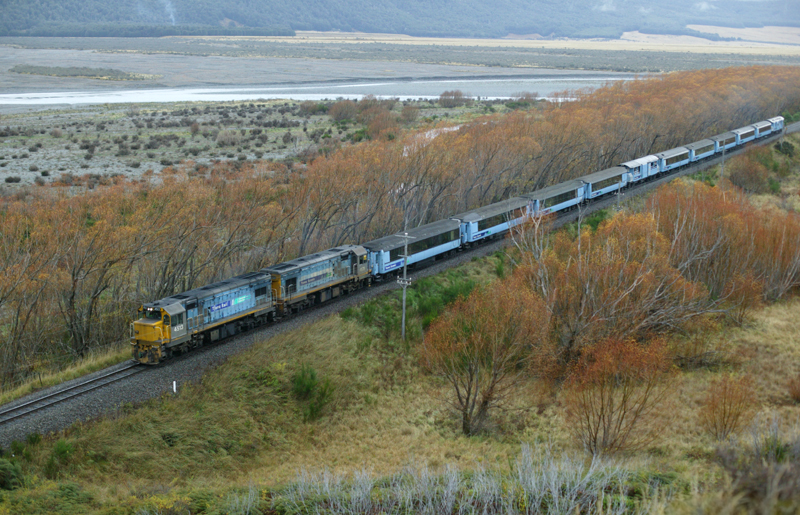
Tranz Rail Cato Blue livery, seen on these two DC class locomotives

Clockwork Orange
1970s orange and yellow livery used on DX class

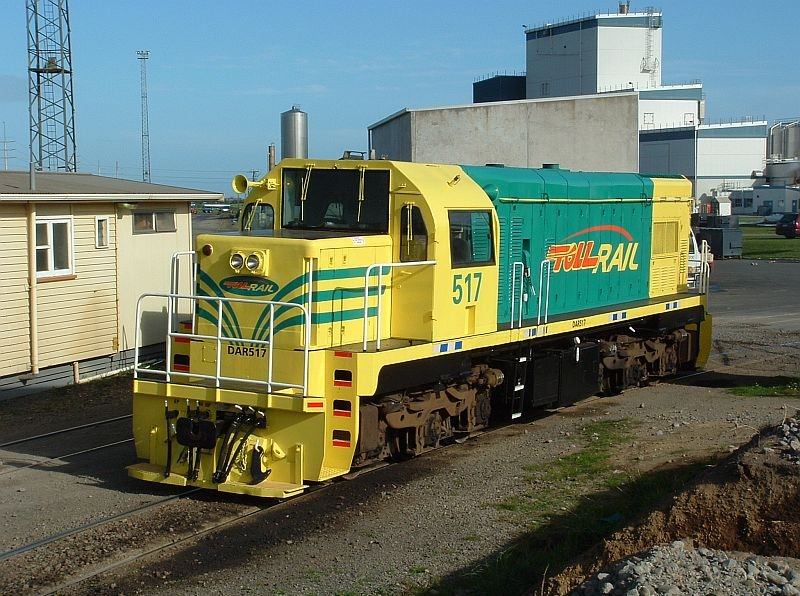
DAR 517 in Corn-cob livery

Corn-cob
Toll Rail yellow and aquamarine livery
Cyclops
A restored Wellington EMU set including DM 556

== D ==
Drewry
A NZR RM class 88 seater railcar
Dora the Explorer

(frequently referred to as just 'Dora')

Northern Explorer

== E ==
'En and chicken
N and M class steam locomotives coupled together. 'En, an abbreviation of 'hen', refers to the larger N class locomotive, and chicken refers to its underpowered M class assistant.

== F ==
Fiat
A NZR RM class 88 seater railcar
Flying Tomato
A simplified version of the Fruit Salad livery, with the grey replaced with red. Applied to members of the DC, DF, DSC, and TR class locomotives in the 1980s as a cheaper alternative to the full Fruit Salad livery.
Fruit Salad
NZR red and grey livery with yellow highlights, also known as International Orange
Foamer
A railfan—particularly one whose enthusiasm appears excessive

== G ==
Grass Grub
A 88 seater railcar converted to carriages for locomotive haulage, from their green livery
Gull Roost
The Onerahi Branch's 323-metre-long bridge across the harbour in Whangārei, because of the large number of gulls that roosted there. The branch closed in 1933 and the bridge no longer exists.

== H ==
The Hill
The Johnsonville Line out of Wellington, or the steep section of the North Auckland Line between Newmarket and Remuera in Auckland. See Over the hill.
Hot water bottle
A F^{S} class steam heating van used to warm the carriages of passenger trains following the withdrawal of steam traction in 1968 (North Island) and 1971 (South Island)
Hot water boy
A member of a heritage railway, or a number of heritage railways, who only volunteers on days where engines are in steam. Will go out of their way to try and fire and drive the locomotive, and when successful will boast and be photographed beside the engine.
Highsider
The L, L^{A}, L^{B}, and L^{C} wagons—so called for their high metal (L^{A}, L^{C}) or wooden (L, L^{B}) sides

== I ==
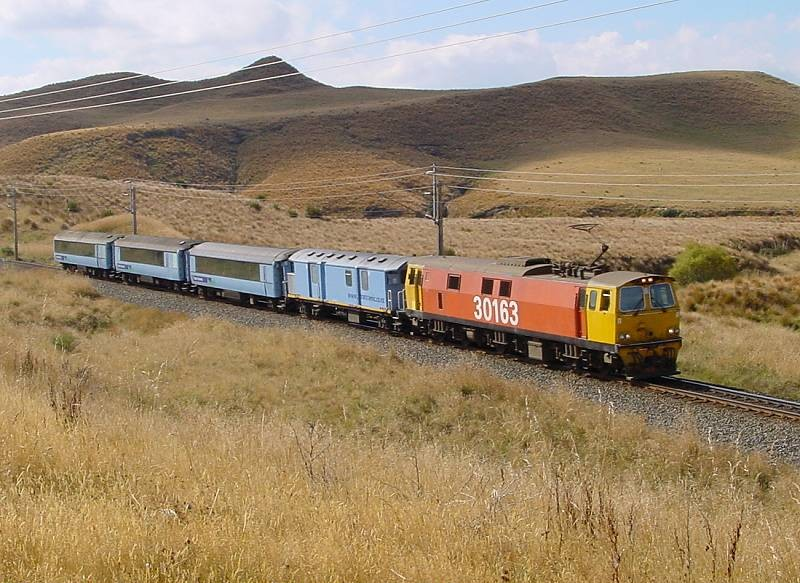
An NZR locomotive in International Orange livery

International Orange
The NZR livery of yellow, orange-red and grey, more popularly known as Fruit Salad

== J ==
Jigger
A track inspection vehicle

== K ==
K^{B} country
The section of the Midland Line between Springfield and Arthur's Pass famous for the use of K^{B} class steam locomotives between 1939 and 1968
Kingston Flyer
Heritage passenger train instituted in 1972 using steam locomotives A^{B} 778 and A^{B} 795, originally between Lumsden and Kingston and later truncated to the 14 km (8.7 mi) between Fairlight and Kingston

== L ==
Longest xylophone in the world
Former road and rail bridge on the now-closed portion of the Ross Branch south of Hokitika—named for the loud rattling its planks made
Lowsiders
The M, M^{A}, M^{B}, M^{C}, and M^{CC} wagons, so called for their low sides. These wagons had lower sides than the L-series 'highsider' wagons, and were often used for loads that could not fit into a highsider or did not warrant the use of one.
Lokey
Locomotive on a bush tramway. Abbreviation of the term 'locomotive', but shortened by bush workers and adopted by railway enthusiasts.

== M ==
Matangi
FT/FT class electric multiple unit used on the Wellington suburban network, chosen in 2008 in a public competition run by the Greater Wellington Regional Council, and comes from the Māori word matangi, meaning wind or breeze (in reference to Wellington's windy reputation)

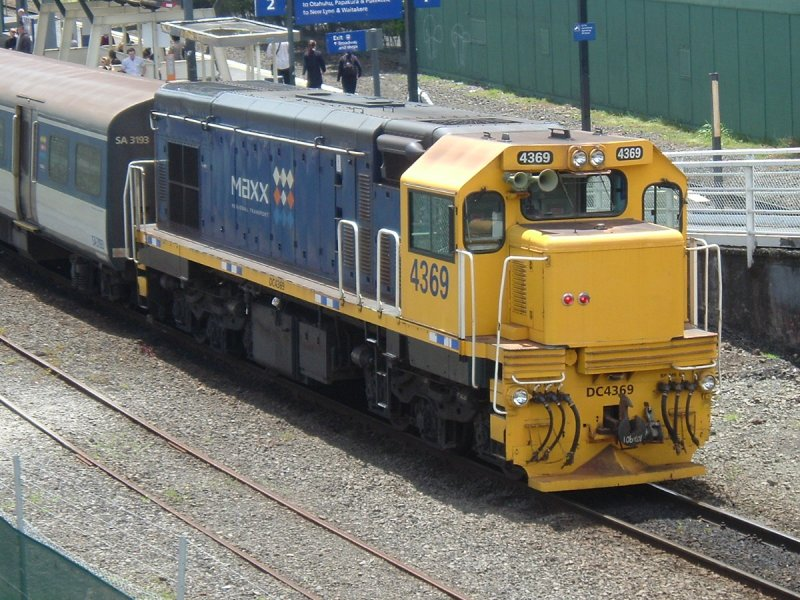
Auckland's MAXX Blue livery

MAXX Blue
Livery on Auckland rolling stock operated by Transdev Auckland
Midland Red
Livery used in the 1920s and 1990s on passenger carriages, DM/D class electric multiple units and some other rolling stock. It was first trialled on the carriages of the Parnassus Express, the predecessor of the Picton Express. Its name derives from the London, Midland and Scottish Railway, from whom the colour was originally sourced.

== N ==
No Name
Several Tranz Rail locomotives received the 'Bumble Bee' paint scheme without any signwriting on the long hood. Mostly applied to members of the DC and DX classes.

== O ==
Old reds
DM/D class electric multiple units in their traditional red livery
Over the hill
The southern approach to Auckland from the North Island Main Trunk Railway at Westfield via the North Auckland Line and Newmarket Line. See The Hill.

== P ==
Pearson's Dream
E 66, nicknamed after its designer, G. A. Pearson, as it did not fulfill his ambitions
Pie Cart
1. Ford Model T railcars RM 4 and RM 5
2. Overhead inspection vehicle PW 2
The Pig
DXR class locomotive 8007 and 8022
The Phoenix
The DM 216 set, stored at Hutt Workshops out of service prior to its return to service in late 2008 or early 2009
Pig Dog
DAR 517
Pimple face
New cabs fitted to ten of the DG class locomotives starting with D^{G} 761 (TMS DG 2111) in late 1979 and ending in 1980
Popsicle
1970s orange and yellow DX class livery
Pullet
M class—named for their lack of pulling power in comparison to other classes

== R ==
The racetrack
The Main South Line near Rakaia, where steam-hauled passenger express trains attained high speeds
Red Terror
A Leyland Cub car converted to run on rails for inspection use by the Railways Department General Manager Garnet Mackley in 1933. It was converted for uses associated with electrified lines in 1941, and after spending a few years in the Hutt Valley, it was transferred to Otira and remained there until the Otira Tunnel was de-electrified in 1997. It is now owned by the Ferrymead Railway.
Roadsider
A Z-class bogie van, so called as they could be unloaded (supposedly) onto the roadside. Often used for parcels traffic, especially by Railfreight, and as luggage vans on express passenger trains, for which they were fitted with x-25330 'Timken' bogies to run at 80 km/h (50 mph).

== S ==
The Sergeant
ED electric locomotive 101, so called because of the three stripes on the body
Super Ganz
The refurbished Ganz Mavag EMU EM 1373

== T ==
Tin Hare
A Wairarapa railcar
Tonka Toy
The preserved TR class locomotive
Tropical
1970s orange and yellow livery; used on the DX class
The Twins
DBR class Wellington-based locomotives 1200 and 1267, commonly paired for purposes such as banking south of Paekākāriki. Because of this nickname, paired DBRs in Auckland are occasionally referred to as "non-identical twins", depending on their liveries.
Thoroughbred
A NZR JA class locomotive, in reference to their high speed and smooth ride, typical of thoroughbred race horses
Trams
The EO class (1923) used in the Otira Tunnel; a term carried over to the 1967 Toshiba replacements, the EA class locomotive.
Twinset
A NZR RM class 88 seater railcar

== See also ==
- Glossary of Australian railway terms
- Glossary of North American railway terms
- Glossary of rail transport terms
- Glossary of United Kingdom railway terms
- Passenger rail terminology
- Rail transport in New Zealand
