= Glossary of United Kingdom railway terms =

This article contains a list of jargon used to varying degrees by railway enthusiasts, trainspotters, and railway employees in the United Kingdom, including nicknames for various locomotives and multiple units. Although not exhaustive, many of the entries in this list appear from time to time in specialist, rail-related publications. There may be significant regional variation in usage.

== A ==
Absolute block signalling
A British signalling scheme designed to ensure the safe operation of a railway by allowing only one train to occupy a defined section of track (block) at a time, used on lines which lack automatic block signalling
Aspect
The indication displayed by a colour-light signal (e.g. a yellow aspect)
Autocoach
A passenger coach fitted with a driving cab and controls for use in an autotrain
Automatic warning system (AWS)
The specific form of limited cab signalling introduced in 1948 in the United Kingdom to help train drivers observe and obey warning signals
Autotrain
Also known as a motor train, a branch-line train consisting of a steam locomotive and passenger carriages that can be driven from either end by means of rodding to the regulator and an additional vacuum brake valve. The fireman remains with the locomotive and, when the driver is at the other end, the fireman controls the cut off and vacuum ejectors in addition to his usual duties.

== B ==
Baby Warship
North British D6300 class locomotives, which used one diesel engine coupled to a hydraulic transmission, making them effectively half a D600 Warship or D800 Warship, each of which had two engines
Bagpipes
British Rail Class 33/1 locomotives, specifically those fitted for push-pull working with 4TC stock
Basils
A nickname for the British Rail Class 755 bi-mode / diesel multiple units. Named for the TV character Basil Fawlty due to many teething problems on introduction.
Bed pan
A name used for the service that used to operate between Bedford and London St. Pancras; this service has subsequently been replaced by cross-London service on the Thameslink route. It is sometimes used when referring to the line from Bedford to St Pancras, and not any service in particular.
Black Five
A LMS Stanier Class 5 4-6-0. Class of steam locomotive built in the UK, named from their black 'mixed-traffic' livery and 'Class 5' power rating.
Blood and Custard
The Crimson and Cream livery used on BR's coaches during the 1950s and 60s
Bobby
A signaller. From Robert Peel; originally, the railway police were responsible for signalling.
Bodysnatcher
British Rail Class 57 diesel-electric locomotives—made by transplanting a General Motors reconditioned power unit and alternator into a Class 47 bodyshell
Bogie

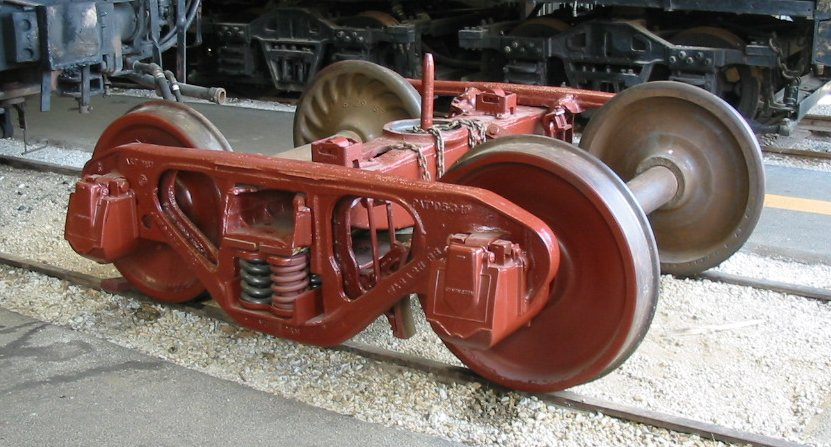
Bettendorf-type freight car bogie

The undercarriage assembly of rolling stock incorporating the train wheels, suspension, brakes and, in powered units, the traction motors
Booking clerk
A member of staff at railway stations, employed to sell tickets to passengers, able to provide advice on ticketing and route options, and responsible for the daily accounts and auditing of the station
Bone
British Rail Class 58 diesel-electric locomotive—from the shape: the body is narrow with wide cabs. (Also called egg timer.) Ironically, one of the final workings of this class was a rail enthusiast special called the Bone Breaker which ended in a bufferstop collision and a passenger breaking his leg.
Brake van
A heavy vehicle with powerful brakes which was attached to the rear of goods trains in the days when most wagons were not fitted with a continuous braking system. Its function was to supplement the locomotive's braking power in slowing and stopping the train and to keep the couplings uniformly tight by selective light braking to avoid snatching and breakages. It also conveyed the train guard, hence its alternative name of "guards van". Partly analogous to the US caboose and its synonyms.
Bubble car
A British Rail Class 121 or 122 single railcar. This name was later made official by Chiltern Railways, the final company to have operated the 121 in mainline service.
Bullhead rail
A steel rail section commonly used in 60 ft lengths on almost all railway lines throughout Britain until c1950, which due to its shape must be supported in cast iron chairs that are screwed to the sleepers. It is still found on some London Underground lines, on secondary and preserved lines, and in yards. The rail has two heads (shaped somewhat like a vertical dumbbell) which led some people to assume that when one side became worn, the rail could be inverted and reinstalled for further service rather than being replaced (it can't, because the two heads are different sizes, and by the time the top became worn down sufficiently to fit in the chairs when the rail is inverted, both the top and the bottom of the rail would be too small for further use).

== C ==
Cant
The superelevation angle of a track (the relative level of one rail to the other), typically around a curve
Cape
A British Railways telegraphic codeword to note the cancellation of a passenger train service
Cess

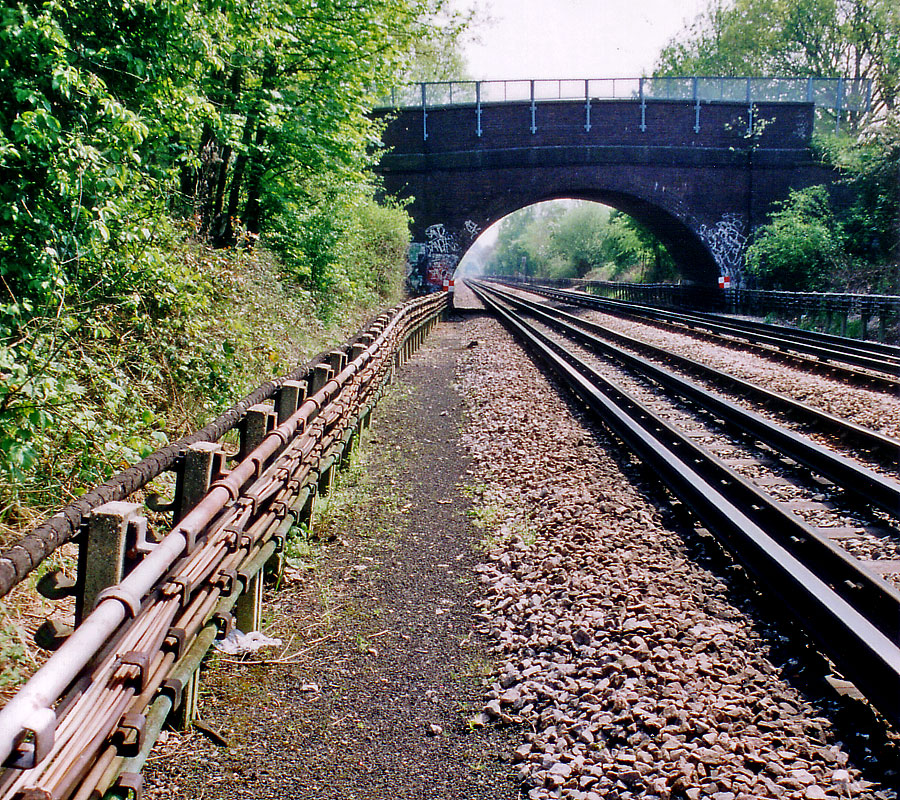
A cess along the London Underground

The area either side of the railway immediately off the ballast shoulder which provides a safe area for workers to stand when trains approach
Chair
A cast iron bracket screwed to the sleeper and used to support bull head rail that is held in place by a wooden key (wedge) or spring steel clip—still found on preserved railways and in yards
Check rail
A double rail section of track, sometimes found in train yards and on bridges to prevent derailments or limit damage caused by derailments, by having rail on both sides of the wheel flange. Also found on curves with a tight radius and switches and crossings
Chimney or funnel
The part of a steam locomotive through which smoke leaves the boiler; known as a smokestack in the United States.
Chopper
British Rail Class 20 diesel-electric locomotive
Chord
A curve connecting two otherwise-unconnected rail lines that lie at tangents to that curve (Usually both lines are straight, one being at a higher level than the other.)
Clag
Originally used to describe the exhaust of steam locomotives, "clag" is a term describing the often spectacular (particularly blackened, as in Class 37, or whitesmoked, as in Class 55) exhaust emissions of many older British diesel locomotives, especially, Classes 52 and 55.
Coach
Railway vehicle for use in passenger trains
Coffee pot
Applied to the shape of SR Q1 class steam locomotives
Composite
A passenger coach with more than one class of accommodation provided (e.g. first and third). In earlier days of three-class travel, first and second class, and second and third class composites were also built. A coach with first, second, and third classes was also known as a tri-composite.
Connecting rod
The drive rod connecting the crosshead to a driving-wheel or axle in a steam locomotive
Coupling (UK)
The mechanical connector at either end of a railway carriage allowing it to couple together with other carriages to form a train
Crompton
British Rail Class 33 diesel-electric locomotive (fitted with Crompton Parkinson electrical equipment). See also Slim Jim.

== D ==
Deltics
British Rail Class 55 diesel-electric locomotives (the "Deltics"), which use twin Napier Deltic power units
Detonator
A small explosive device strapped to the top of a rail to alert an approaching train of danger ahead by creating a loud noise upon contact with a locomotive wheel
Doodlebug
Waggon und Maschinenbau railbuses E79960-64, introduced 1958
Down
A direction (usually away from London, other capital city, or the headquarters of the railway concerned) or side (on left-running railways, the left side when facing in the down direction).
Drain
The Waterloo & City line, a short line in London, is nicknamed "The Drain".
Driver
The operator of a railway locomotive
Driving trailer
A passenger coach which has a full set of train controls at one end, allowing for the use of push-pull train operation
Driving Van Trailer (DVT)
A class of control car that allows the driver to operate with a locomotive in push-pull formation from the opposite end of a train.
Dutch
The livery of British Rail Civil Engineers department rolling stock, due to the resemblance of Nederlandse Spoorwegen's corporate livery

== E ==
Egg Timer
British Rail Class 58 diesel-electric locomotive
Electra
The British Rail Class 91's alternative name

== F ==
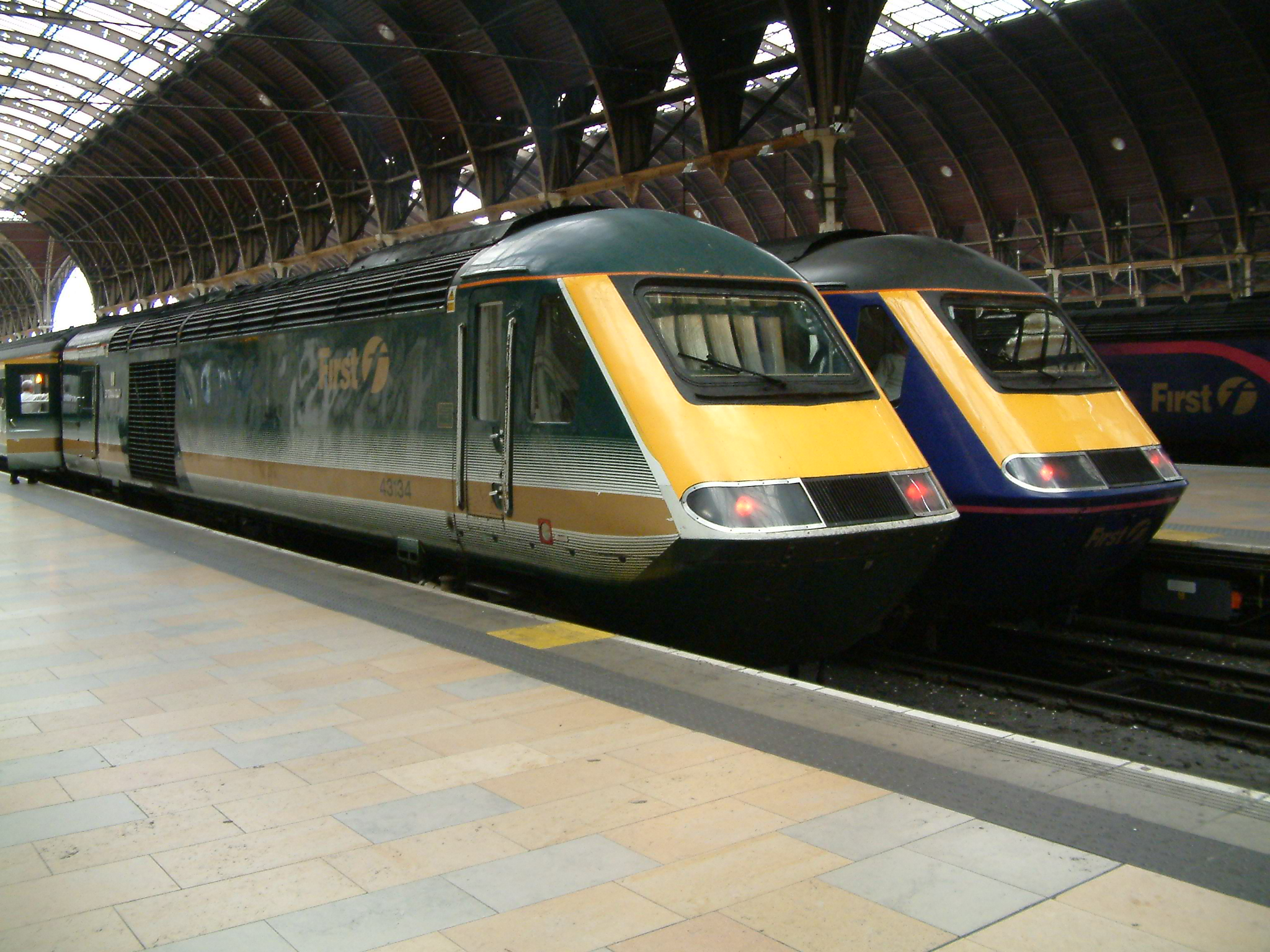
HST power car (foreground) in FGW fag packet livery

Fag packet livery
The original livery of the First Great Western HSTs—a green colour scheme, fading to ivory with shiny gold stripe below the windows, so called because it resembles the packaging of a brand of Rothman's cigarettes ('fags')
Ferret and Dartboard
The second British Railways emblem introduced in 1956, featuring a lion rampant holding a wheel. From a distance the wheel has a passing resemblance to a dartboard.
Fishplate
A metal plate that joins the ends of rails in jointed track
Flat junction
A junction in which all track crossings take place at grade and routings must therefore be controlled by signals and interlocking
Flat wagon
A type of rolling stock, which can be a flat-bottomed car with no sides on which freight (including intermodal containers) can be stacked. A bulkhead is a flatcar with walls on the front and rear. A center-beam bulkhead is a bulkhead flatcar with an additional wall dividing one side of the flatcar from the other, but still without any sides.
Fly shunting
The practice of uncoupling a locomotive from a wagon in motion and running over point, whereupon an employee on the ground lines the point to divert the vehicle onto an adjacent track. Once commonplace, this practice has led to several lawsuits against railway companies and is now strictly prohibited due to the high risk to life and property.
Flying Banana
The first design of GWR diesel railcars, introduced in 1932. This has since been adopted for the Network Rail New Measurement Train, due to its all-over yellow livery. Also occasionally used to describe the High Speed Train.
Formation
The group of rail vehicles making up a train, or more commonly a group of locomotives connected together for multiple-unit (MU) operation
Four foot
The area between the running rails of a standard-gauge track; the actual distance is 4 ft 8 1/2 in (1,435 mm). See also six-foot and ten-foot.

== G ==
Goods
The products which are carried
Goods van, goods wagon, or goods truck, railway wagon, or wagon
A type of rolling stock with a flat bottom enclosed on all sides and top, which is loaded and unloaded from sliding doors on each side
Goyle
A British Rail Class 31 diesel-electric locomotive—from "gargoyle" (after the somewhat ungainly headcode boxes above the driving cabs)
Gricer
A rail enthusiast
Grid or grid iron
A British Rail Class 56 diesel-electric locomotive, from the large grilles
Gronk

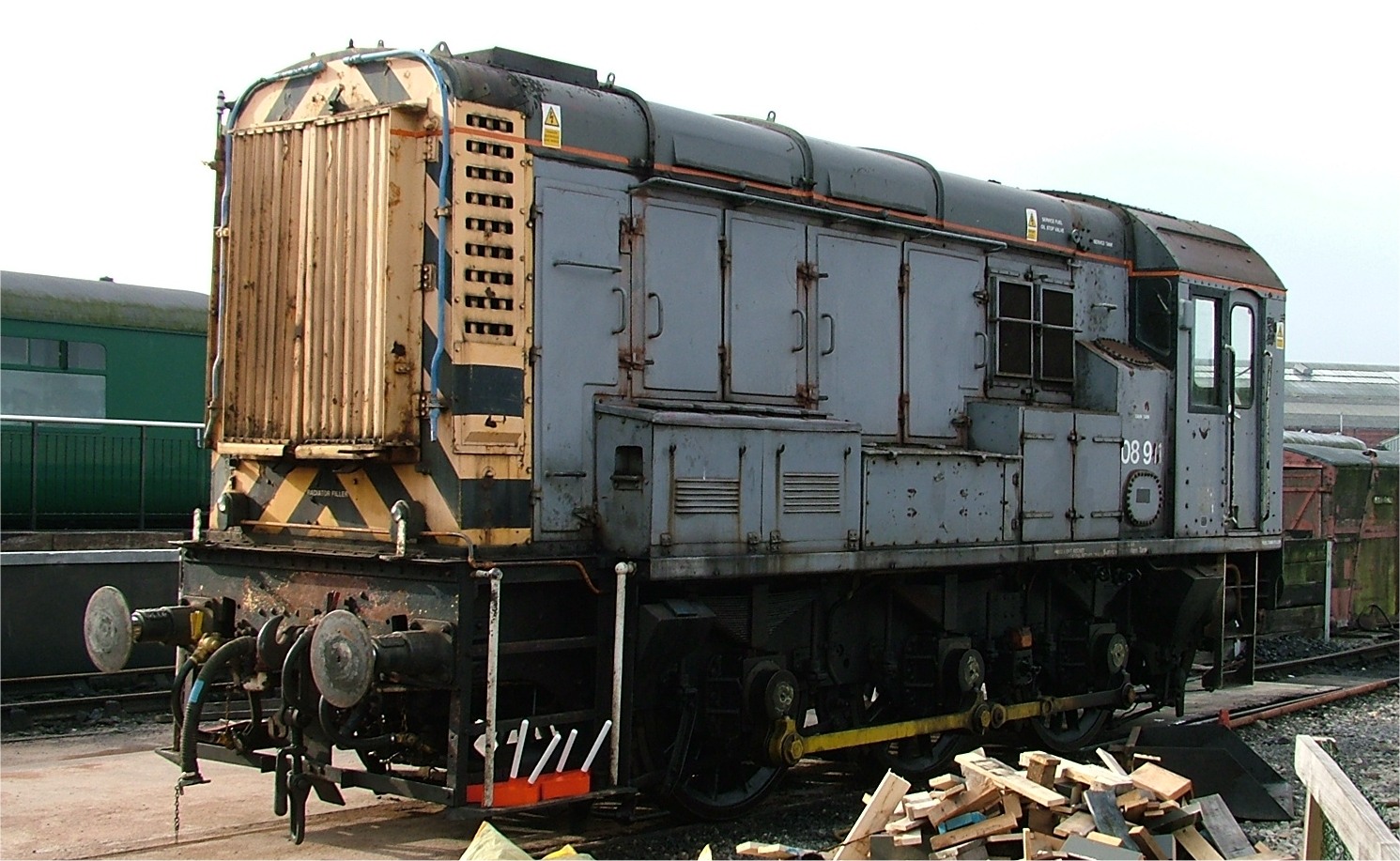
A British Rail Class 08 Gronk

A British Rail Class 08 or Class 09 shunter
Growler
A British Rail Class 37 diesel-electric locomotive (from the engine sound)
Guard
The person in charge of a train and its crew. On passenger trains, a conductor is also responsible for tasks such as assisting passengers and collecting tickets.
Gurgler
A nickname for the British Rail Class 31, on account of its engine noise

== H ==
Headshunt
A length of track feeding a number of sidings that permits the sidings to be shunted without blocking the main line, or where two lines merge into one before ending with a buffer, to allow a run-round procedure to take place
Hoover
A British Rail Class 50 diesel-electric locomotive—from the sound of the engine cooling fans being similar to a vacuum cleaner, prior to the refurbishment which removed this characteristic
Hymek
A D7000 class locomotive using a V16 Maybach diesel engine coupled to a Mekydro hydraulic transmission
Happy Train

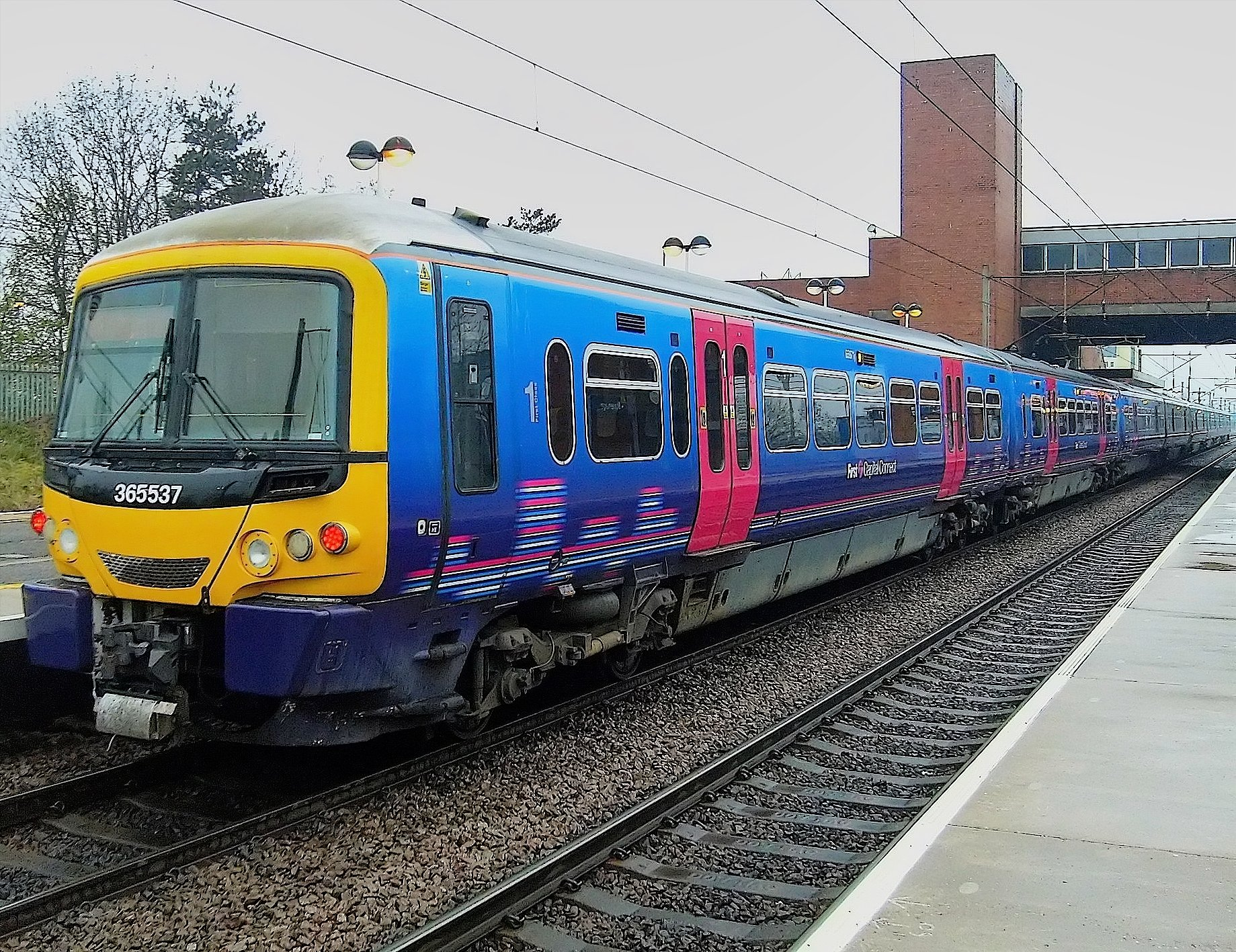
A Class 365 Happy Train

A British Rail Class 365 because their revised front end resembles a grinning face.

== J ==
Javelin
British Rail Class 395 electric multiple units, due to their usage during the London 2012 Summer Olympics on Olympic Javelin Shuttle services
Joint station
A railway station at which tracks and facilities are shared by two or more railways

== K ==
Key
Timber or sprung steel block used to secure Bullhead rail into the chairs

== L ==
Lamp
A portable (often handheld) light source that is used to signal train crews
Large-logo livery

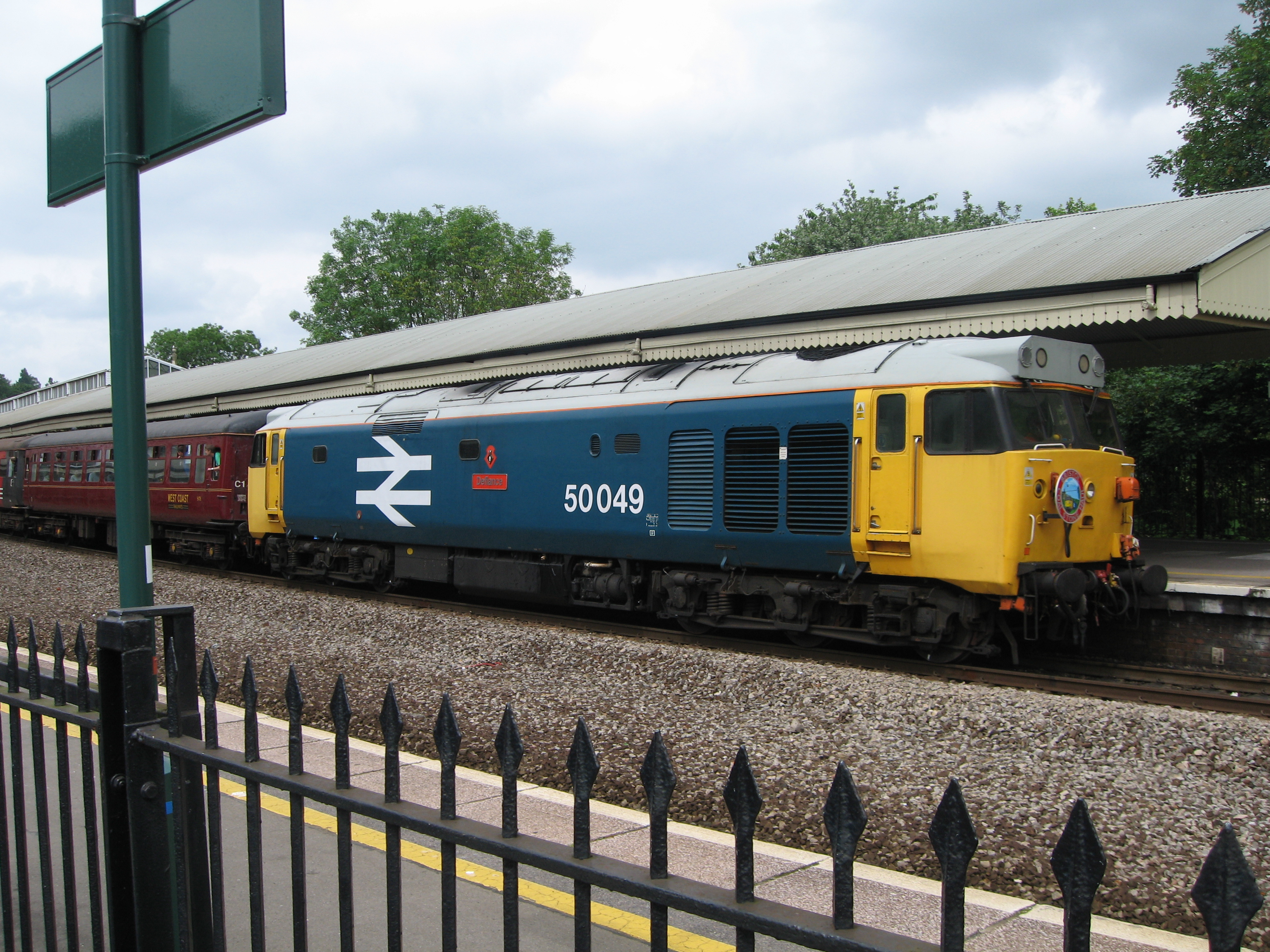
Preserved Class 50 50 049 Defiance, in large-logo livery

One of the first new British Rail locomotive liveries applied after many years of all-over rail blue. For this livery, the loco cabs were entirely 'warning yellow', with black window surrounds (the yellow usually wrapping round behind the cab doors); the main bodysides were still rail blue but featured very large running numbers with a large white British Rail 'double arrow' logo in the middle, the full height of the body. It was applied to refurbished Class 50 locomotives, among others.
Location case
A trackside cabinet used to house signalling equipment such as relays or transformers
Loop
A second parallel track (running for a short distance) on single-track railway lines, allowing a train to pass another

== M ==
Main line
A principal artery of a railway system
Merry-go-round (MGR) train
Coal train running between a coal mine and a power station, loading and unloading without stopping or shunting
Metrovick
Locomotives constructed by Metropolitan-Vickers, especially the British Rail Class 28 (D5700 class) Co-Bo
Mickey Mouse
An Ivatt 2MT class 2-6-0 steam locomotive
Motion
Collective term for the connecting rod, coupling rods, and valve gear—forms part of the running gear
Multiple working
The ability of diesel and electric locomotives or multiple units to be joined together and controlled from one driving station. Such a set of joined locomotives is called a consist or (colloquially) "lash-up" and is said to be "MUed together".

== N ==
Networker Clubman
A British Rail Class 168 Clubman unit with original front end, so called because it resembles the front end of a Networker

== O ==
Open wagon
A type of rolling stock with a flat bottom and relatively low sides, used to haul material such as ore or scrap, and loaded and unloaded from the top which may be covered or uncovered
Overbridge
A bridge over the railway
Overlap
A distance (normally 180 metres or set according to the permitted speed of the line) beyond a stop signal which must be clear before the preceding stop signal can display a proceed aspect; allows a margin in case a train overshoots a signal before stopping

== P ==
Peak
A British Rail Class 44, Class 45, or Class 46 diesel-electric locomotive—so named because the earliest of these loco types, the ten Class 44s, were named after mountains
Person in charge of possession (PICOP)
The railway or contractor's official responsible for safe working during engineer's possession
Point machine
A motor or device which operates points
Points
The articulating rails that determine the route to be taken
Plastic Pig

Nickname for the British Rail Class 442 5-WES built by British Rail Engineering Limited at Derby Litchurch Lane Works. Called so because of the use of plastics during their construction

Possession
Closure of a section of railway for engineering or track renewal purposes
Pump trolley

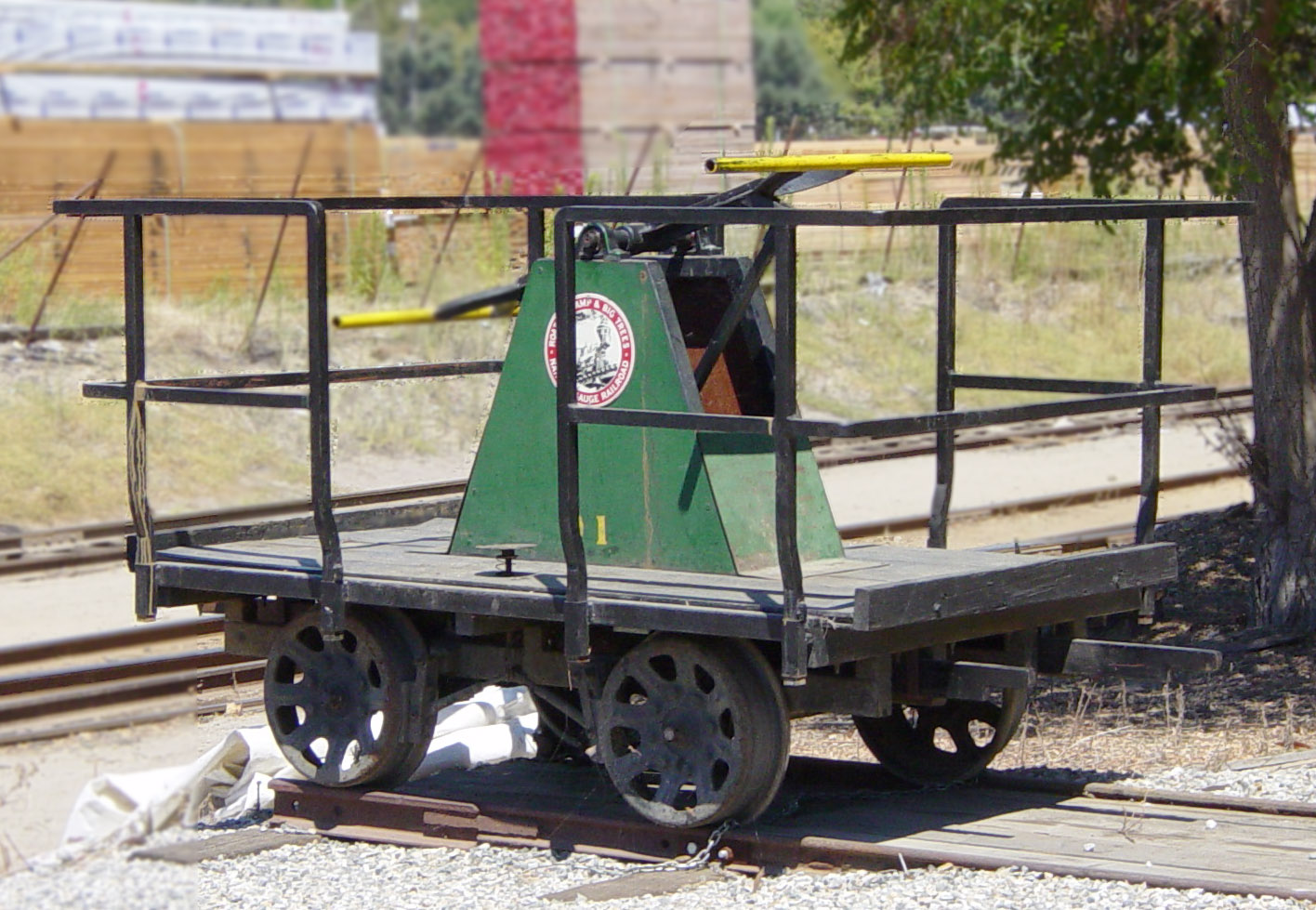
A pump trolley

A small, hand-powered railroad car used for track inspection

== R ==
Rail head treatment
The practice of cleaning low adhesion track surfaces to free them of leaves, snow or ice. This is typically done with multi-purpose vehicles or specialist rail head cleaning equipment.
Railheading
The practice of travelling further than necessary to reach a rail service, typically by car. The phenomenon is common among commuters seeking a more convenient journey. Reasons for railheading include: that discounted fares may be available on another part of the route; to access a more frequent service.
Rake
A set of rolling stock coupled together
Rat
British Rail Class 25 diesel-electric locomotives—and related classes—reputedly originating from a term used on the LMR of British Rail in the 1960s where 25s were as common as "rats"; the Scottish-based Class 26 and 27 were sometimes known as "MacRats".
Roarer
Early British Rail 25 kV AC electric locomotive of types 'AL1'–'AL5' (later Classes 81, 82, 83, 84, 85), due to the loud whine made by the traction motor cooling fans when the locomotive is at rest. The name originated with the AL3 type. Although the other types exhibit a less noticeable noise, the name is applied equally to any of them.
Rule Book
The system of rules for the safe operation of the railway, maintained by the Rail Safety and Standards Board.
Running powers
The legal right of one railway company to use the tracks of another, as agreed to by the companies concerned or their predecessors

== S ==
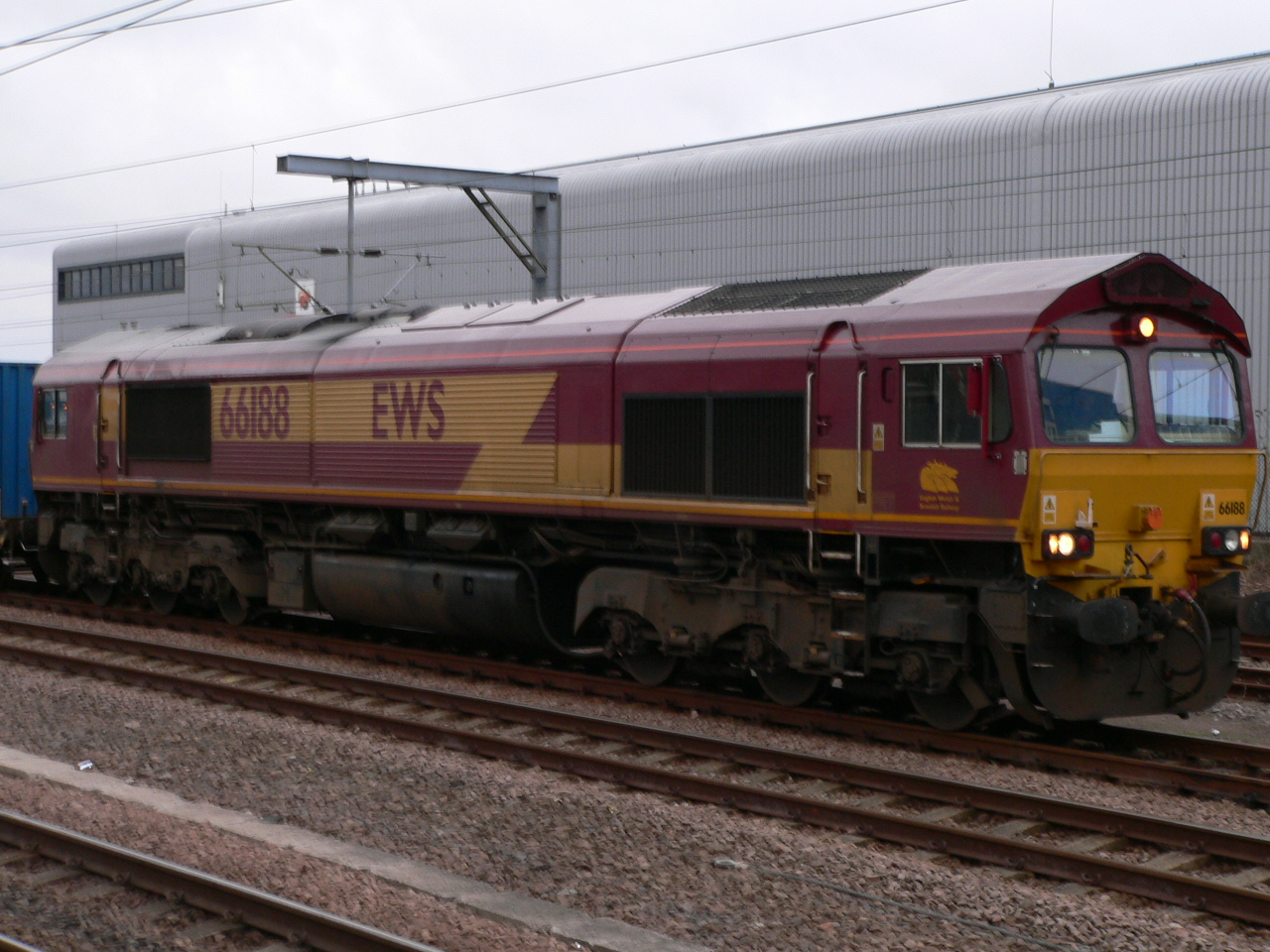
The roof shape on Class 66 diesel locos resembles that of a garden shed.

Shed
A Canadian-built Class 66 diesel-electric locomotive (from the roof shape and also the corrugated bodysides)
Shunter
1. A small locomotive used for assembling trains and moving Railway wagons around
2. A person involved in such work
Signal passed at danger (SPAD)
An incident when a train passes a stop signal without authority
Signal-post telephone (SPT)
A direct no-dial telephone link to the relevant signal box, positioned on or near a signal
Silver bullet
China Clay slurry wagons
Six foot
The space between a pair of adjacent lines, nominally six feet wide. See also four-foot and ten-foot.
Skipper
a livery worn by a handful of Class 142 DMUs in the 1980s when they worked on the Great Western route. Called so for the original GWR's Skipper livery, also known as Chocolate and Cream.
Slack action
Looseness in a train caused by mating clearances in couplers
Slam-door train
Any diesel or electric multiple unit with manually opening hinged doors (mostly the British rail classes 423 and 421), so called after the noise made by passengers slamming the doors
Sleeper

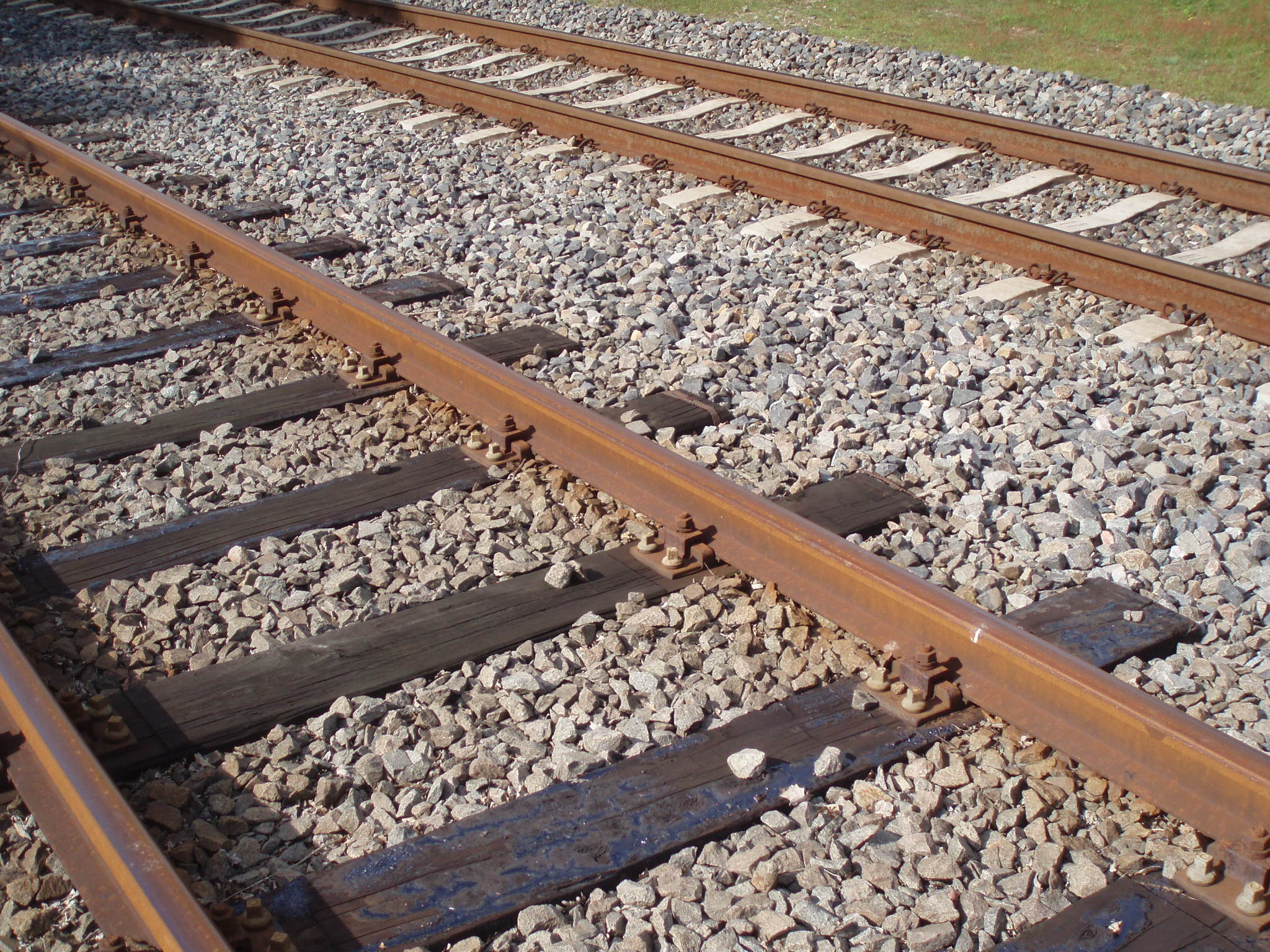
Wood (left track) and concrete (right track) sleepers beneath the rails

Bars of wood or concrete placed beneath and perpendicular to track to support the rails
Slim Jim
Narrow-bodied version of the British Rail Class 33 diesel-electric locomotive (identified as sub-class 33/2)—built for the confined loading gauge on the Hastings line. See also Crompton).
Slip coach
A passenger coach that is disconnected from a train without the train having to stop. While the train continued on its route, the slip coach would be guided and stopped by a guard on board using the coach's own brake mechanism. This practice was almost entirely limited to the United Kingdom and was discontinued in the 1960s.
Spinner
A Midland Railway 115 Class steam locomotive, due to their large driving wheels
Station pilot
A shunting engine based at a major passenger station and used for passenger-train shunting duties
Stop and examine
A now-defunct British Railways rule which required a train crew to stop the train and examine the cause of an unexpected noise, vibration, or other irregular events.
Subway
A tunnel passing underneath the railway tracks to allow passengers to cross from one platform to another
Superelevation
The banking of railway track on curves. Specifically, the practice on high speed lines (where the cant needs to be higher) of gently introducing the elevation of the outer rail before the bend starts, in order to avoid sudden lurches. Synonymous with cant.

== T ==
Tadpole
A 3R diesel electric multiple unit (DEMU), named due to having two vehicles 8 ft 2½ in wide and one vehicle 9 ft 3 in wide
Tank engine
A locomotive that carries its own fuel and water instead of hauling a tender
Teddy Bear
A British Rail Class 14 diesel-hydraulic locomotive for shunting and trip working. Coined by Swindon Works' foreman George Cole who quipped "We've built the Great Bear, now we're going to build a Teddy Bear!".
Ten foot
The space between sets of lines (e.g. between pairs of fast and slow lines). See also four-foot and six-foot.
Terminus (UK)
A station sited where a railway line or service ends or terminates
Terrier

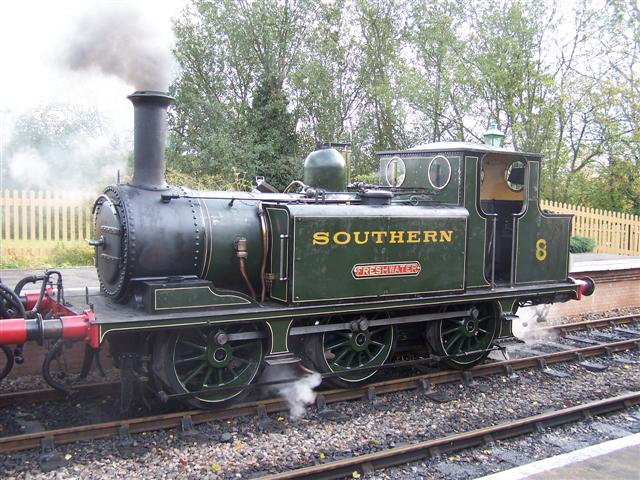
A preserved Southern A1 Class Terrier

The LB&SCR A1 Class 0-6-0 steam locomotive, on account of its distinctive "bark" when running
Thumper
Southern DEMU (BR Classes 201–207)—unlike conventional DMUs these used a single, comparatively large diesel engine and electric generator mounted immediately behind one driving cab. The power units made a distinctive "thumping" noise when working hard.
Thunderbird
A locomotive kept on standby at a strategic location, ready to rescue a failed train—from Thunderbirds
Top and tail
A train with locomotives at both ends, for ease of changing direction
Tractor
A British Rail Class 37 diesel-electric locomotive, possibly from the engine sound, also because they could be found hauling almost anything as a mixed-traffic design
Train driver
The operator of a locomotive
Train engine
The locomotive closest to the train during a double-heading operation
Train register
A book or loose-leaf sheets kept in a signal box and used to record the passage of trains, messages passed, and other prescribed events
Train shed
The part of a railway station where the tracks and platforms are covered by a roof. Also known as an overall roof.
Triangle

A triangle

Three railway tracks in a triangular form with points at all three corners—can be used to turn a train around
Tug
A British Rail Class 60 diesel-electric locomotive, as named because of their tremendous pulling power, size and sluggish nature. Class 60s upgraded by DB Schenker are called 'Super Tugs'.

== U ==
U-Boat
A Southern Railway U class 2-6-0 steam locomotive
Underbridge
A bridge carrying the railway and allowing a roadway to pass under the railway
Up
A direction (usually towards London, other capital city, or the headquarters of the railway concerned) or side (on left-running railways, the left side when facing in the up direction). The opposite of down. The up direction is usually associated with even-numbered trains and signals.

== W ==
Warship
A D600 or D800 class diesel-hydraulic locomotives, most of which were named after Royal Navy vessels
Water crane
A device used for delivering a large volume of water into the tank or tender of a steam locomotive
Western
A British Rail Class 52 diesel-hydraulic type 4 locomotive, 74 of which ran on BR between 1961 and 1977. All were named in a series beginning "Western...". Seven of the class have been preserved. Also known as "Thousands" as their numbering system started at D1000, and "Wizzos" from the sound of their engine.
Whistler
A British Rail Class 40 diesel-electric locomotive, from the turbocharger sound; this nickname is also occasionally applied to British Rail Class 20 locomotives.
Woolworth
A South Eastern and Chatham Railway N class 2-6-0 steam locomotive, built at Woolwich Arsenal

== Y ==
Yeoman
An early name for a Class 59 diesel-electric locomotive, the first privately owned (by Foster Yeoman) locomotives to operate on British Rail, owing to their names starting with "Yeoman" such as 59 001 Yeoman Endeavour

== See also ==
- Glossary of Australian railway terms
- Glossary of New Zealand railway terms
- Glossary of North American railway terms
- Glossary of rail transport terms
- Passenger rail terminology
