= New South Wales Z15 class locomotive =

Class of 4-4-0 steam locomotives operated in Australia

New South Wales Z15 class
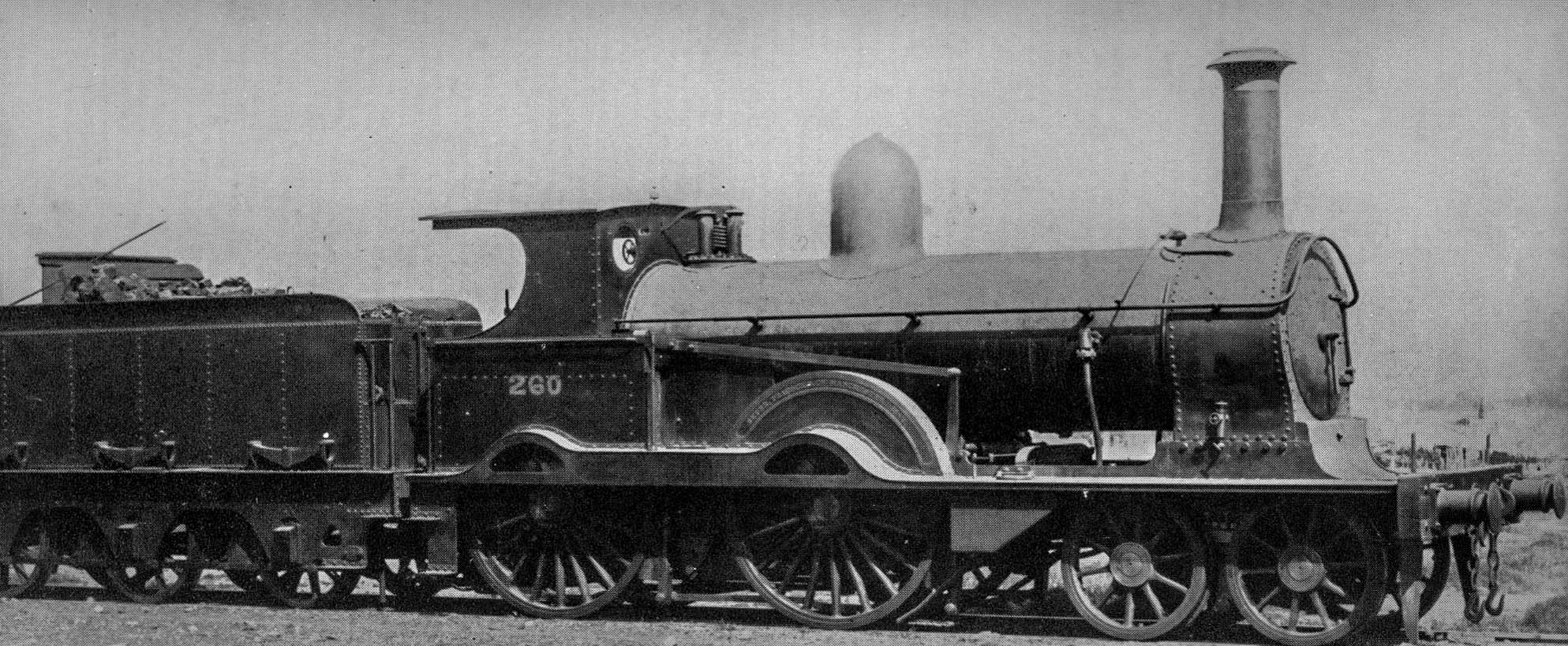
Type and origin
- Power type: Steam
- Builder: Beyer, Peacock & Company
- Build date: 1882
- Total produced: 6
Specifications
- Configuration
  - Whyte: 4-4-0
- Gauge: 4 ft 8 1/2 in (1,435 mm) standard gauge
- Boiler pressure: 150lbs
- Cylinders: 2
- Cylinder size: 17" x 26"
Performance figures
- Maximum speed: 70 mph (110 km/h)
- Tractive effort: 12,200
Career
- Operators: New South Wales Government Railways
- Nicknames: Peacock High Flyers
- Scrapped: 1929-1937
- Disposition: All scrapped

The Z15 class was a class of 4-4-0 steam locomotives operated by the New South Wales Government Railways of Australia.

In 1882/83, Beyer, Peacock & Company built six 4-4-0 locomotives to operate passenger services on the newly extended Main Southern line to Albury. All were fitted with Belpaire boilers in 1902/03. All were scrapped between 1929 and 1937.
