= Track renewal train =

Rail and sleeper replacement machine

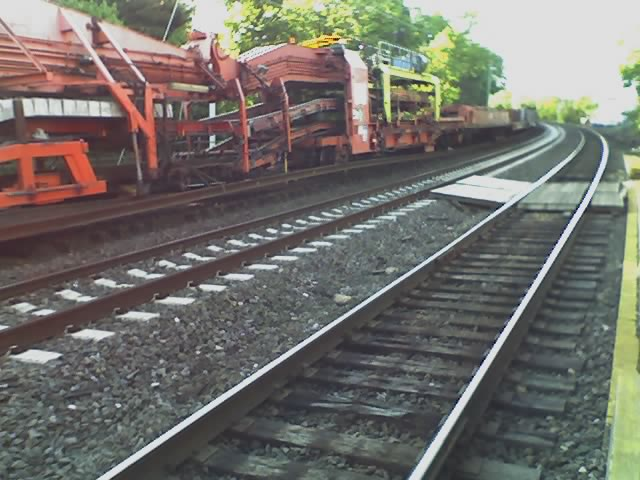
A track renewal train in Pennsylvania

Video of a track renewal train north of Cologne, Germany

A track renewal train (also known as a track renewal system or new track construction machine) is a work train that consists of many units of machinery and materials required for track renewal (rail and sleeper replacement) projects.

== Rail preparation ==
To minimize the time of track during a track renewal project, a track renewal train is used to automate most of the required process. Prior to the arrival of the track renewal train, preparation tasks must be completed. In some cases, the old rail needs to be cut into smaller segments and joined with fishplates. The rail fastening system may need to be released prior to its arrival.

The new rails usually need to be prepared prior to the arrival of track renewal train. Rails are delivered to the center of the track. Those rail pieces are welded by track workers to form continuous welded rail (CWR) and left at the center of the track at the exact position required by the track renewal train to pick up at its arrival.

== Track renewal process ==
A track renewal train has a series of machinery units that are combined into one train. As the track renewal train moves forward, the track renewal process will be done stage by stage to the completion of track renewal as it leaves the area.

=== Old sleeper removal ===
The first stage of track renewal is the removal of old sleepers. The releasing rail fastening system from the sleepers may be part of this process. Some machines integrate the semi-automatic clip-releasing devices by hoisting such devices as part of the track renewal train to allow operators to manually position the device to each clip and trigger it to automatically release the clip. Some units have a machine to automatically remove spikes in the older type of wooden sleepers.

After rails are untied from the sleepers, those old rails will be lifted up and pushed toward the sides of the train. The new rails are also fed in near the sides of the train in preparation to be inserted.

The track renewal train has a machine that pulls the old sleepers out from the ballast. These old sleepers are delivered into the conveyors to move them out for storage at the rear of the train.

The ballast bed is then cleared in preparation of laying new concrete sleepers. In case there is a need to lower the ballast bed, the ballast excavating process will be done. This process is integrated into the track renewal train in some models. Excess ballast in that case will be moved out through the conveyor belt to the ballast storage area. Those old ballast materials will be screened and cleaned to be reused. The unusable ballast will kept in a separate storage to be discarded.

Some machines have an automatic track copying by recording the track geometry of the old rails prior to the removal, then the machine will calculate the exact amount to clear the ballast bed to prepare for laying new sleepers and rails to match to the original geometry of the old ones in term of cant, leveling and positioning.

=== New sleeper laying ===
There are gantry cranes attached to the top of the track renewal train. These cranes run along the special side rails of the train. These special rails also connect between cars allowing operators to travel along the entire length of the train. The cranes are used to transport old sleepers into the storage area and bring the new sleepers into the working area.

The new sleepers are delivered by the cranes to feed into the machine. The machine puts sleepers onto the ballast bed and spaces them to the exact position required by specification.

=== New rail insertion ===
After the new sleepers are laid, the new rails will be pushed from the side of the train into position on the sleepers. To prevent rail stressing due to temperature fluctuations during normal operation, the rail will need to be laid at a precise temperature, based on anticipated operating temperatures. This is done by heater units of the track renewal train that warm the rails to the specification before laying on the sleepers. Another unit has an automated process to clip the rails onto the sleepers.

Depending on the models of the track renewal train, the old rail will be laid either inside at the center of track or outside the new track at the shoulder waiting to be picked up by another work train.

At the end, a large crane or conveyor belt with a magnet will be used to take all loose parts that have been left on the tracks to storage for reuse or recycling. The new track will be inspected prior to the ballast handling.

=== Ballast handling ===
After the track renewal train completes the tasks, the ballast will be put back on the track. For track renewal trains that do not have ballast excavating machines included, workers will use a shoulder ballast cutter machine that takes excess ballast that has been pushed out during the track renewal process, into a screening and cleaning machine. The reusable ballast will be put back to the new track together with the new ballast materials. For track renewal trains that do not include track copying or leveling, a ballast tamper will be used to make final adjustments to the track to the correct specification. A ballast regulator will then be used to make the final shape of the ballast.

Some track renewal train units have the ballast handling included such that the entire process of shoulder cutting, cleaning and placing of ballast is fully integrated.

== Examples ==
- P95 by Matisa, Switzerland
- Track Renewal Train TRT-909 by Harsco, United States
- RU 800 S by Plasser & Theurer, Austria

== Alternative methods ==
There was also another method of track renewal for double track area. Jarvis Rail invented a special type of machine called Slinger to run on the parallel track and deliver the pre-assembled track panels of up to 270 meters into the track to be renewed. This process was used in the United Kingdom.

== Projects ==
Here are some notable track renewal projects that use the track renewal trains:

- Union Pacific Railroad track renewal to include higher speed rail services in Chicago area using TRT-909
- Track renewal between Les Aubrais and Vierzon in France using Matisa's track renewal train
