= Guide Bridge Sidings =

Railway stabling point in Greater Manchester, England

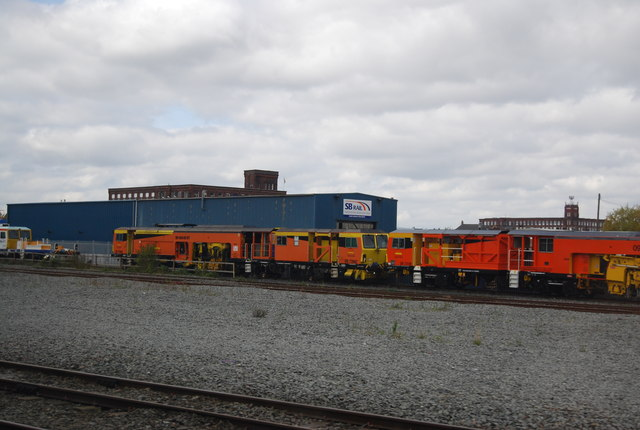
- Colas Rail tampers at the stabling point (2014)
- Interactive map of Guide Bridge Sidings

Location
- Location: Audenshaw, Metropolitan Borough of Tameside, England
- Coordinates: 53.4759°N 2.1076°W
- OS grid: SJ929977

Characteristics
- Owner: SB Rail
- Depot code: GU
- Type: On-track machine depot

Guide Bridge Sidings is a railway stabling point in Guide Bridge, Greater Manchester, England. The depot lies to the east of Guide Bridge station, on a junction of the Huddersfield line and the branch to Stalybridge.

== History ==
A line of Class 76 locomotives at the stabling point, along with members of Classes 08, 25 and 37

In the 1970s and early 1980s, British Rail stabled Class 40 diesel and Class 76 electric locomotives at the depot.

== Description ==
The depot is occupied by SB Rail, a joint venture between Babcock Rail and Swietelsky, used for stabling and maintaining their fleet of tamper, ballast regulators and track finishing machines.

Network Rail opened a new rail maintenance depot on a former siding in March 2026, which brought four separate track maintenance teams together under one roof; these are Permanent Way, Off Track, Lubrication, and Welding & Grinding. Its maintenance delivery units are based here.

The site is also used occasionally by Balfour Beatty, Colas Rail and Harsco Rail for their tampers, stoneblowers, track stabilisers, single line track relayers, drain suckers, ballast cleaners, ballast regulators, rail grinders, overhead line and track inspection multi-purpose vehicles.
