= Y-shape steel sleeper =

Type of railway sleeper

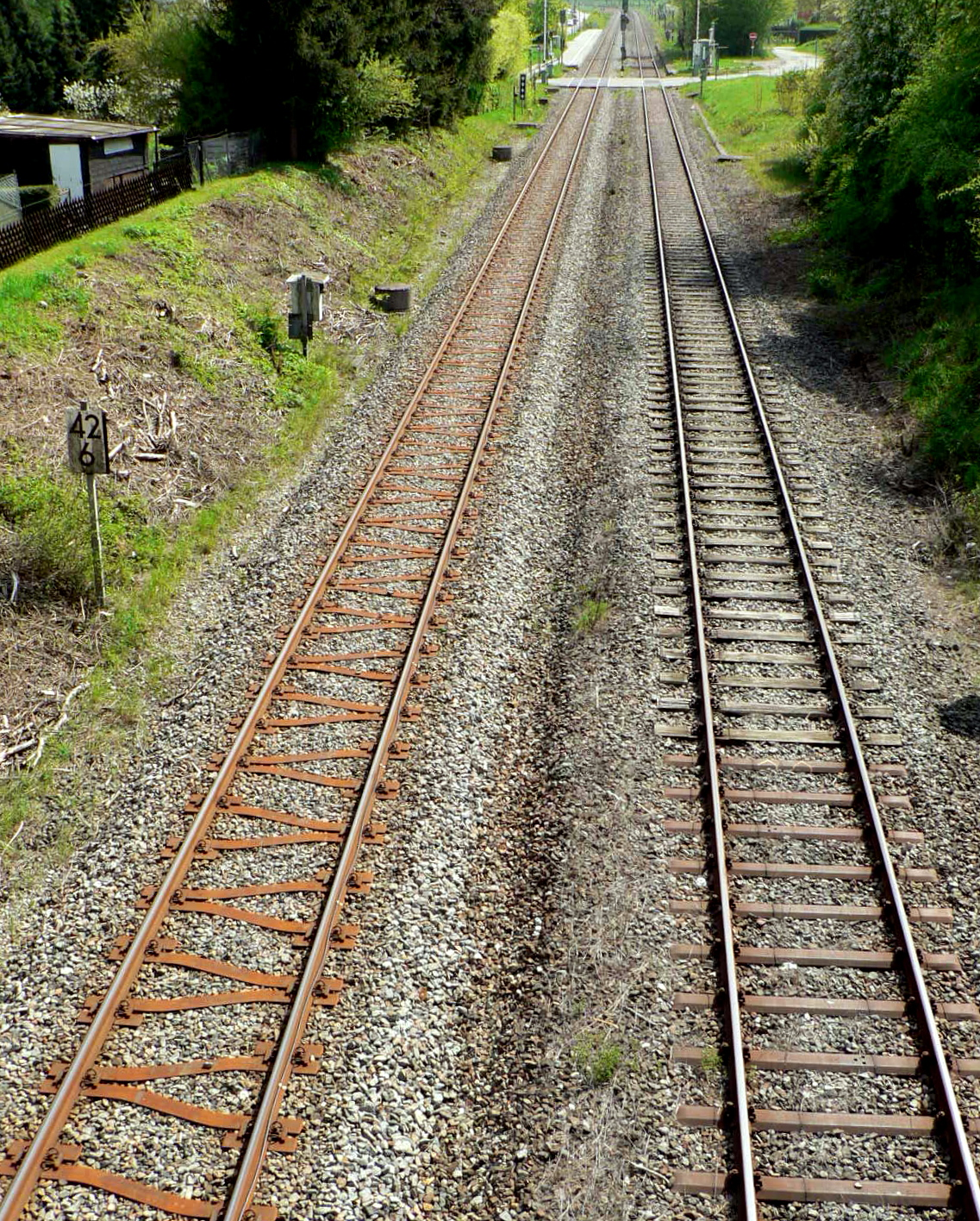
Y-shape steel sleepers (left), versus straight steel/wood sleepers (right)

Y-shaped steel sleepers (German: Y-Stahlschwellen) are a type of railway sleeper designed to support railway track with a rail fastening system at three points of contact.

== History and overview ==
Y-shaped steel sleepers are installed in an alternating, right-left pattern. They consists of two IB 100 S primary beams curved outward by 180mm or 210mm. For one Y-shaped sleeper, one primary beam is curved to the right, then one is curved to the left: this produces the forked form of the sleeper. They are connected by L-profile sections at the bottom chords, and square-crossed members at the upper chords.

Y-shaped steel sleepers are primarily used on lines with low axle weights, such as urban and secondary lines. Like steel sleepers, their primary advantages compared to concrete or wooden sleepers include:

- Low weight (for easier handling)
- Low overall profile (reducing the depth and volume of the ballast bed)

Compared to regular straight steel sleepers, they feature:

- High torsional and frame stiffness
- High resistance to lateral and longitudinal displacement

Disadvantages include:

- High investment cost
- Need for specialised tamping equipment

Y-sleepers have also been used in some ballastless track systems.
