= New Zealand rail maintenance equipment =

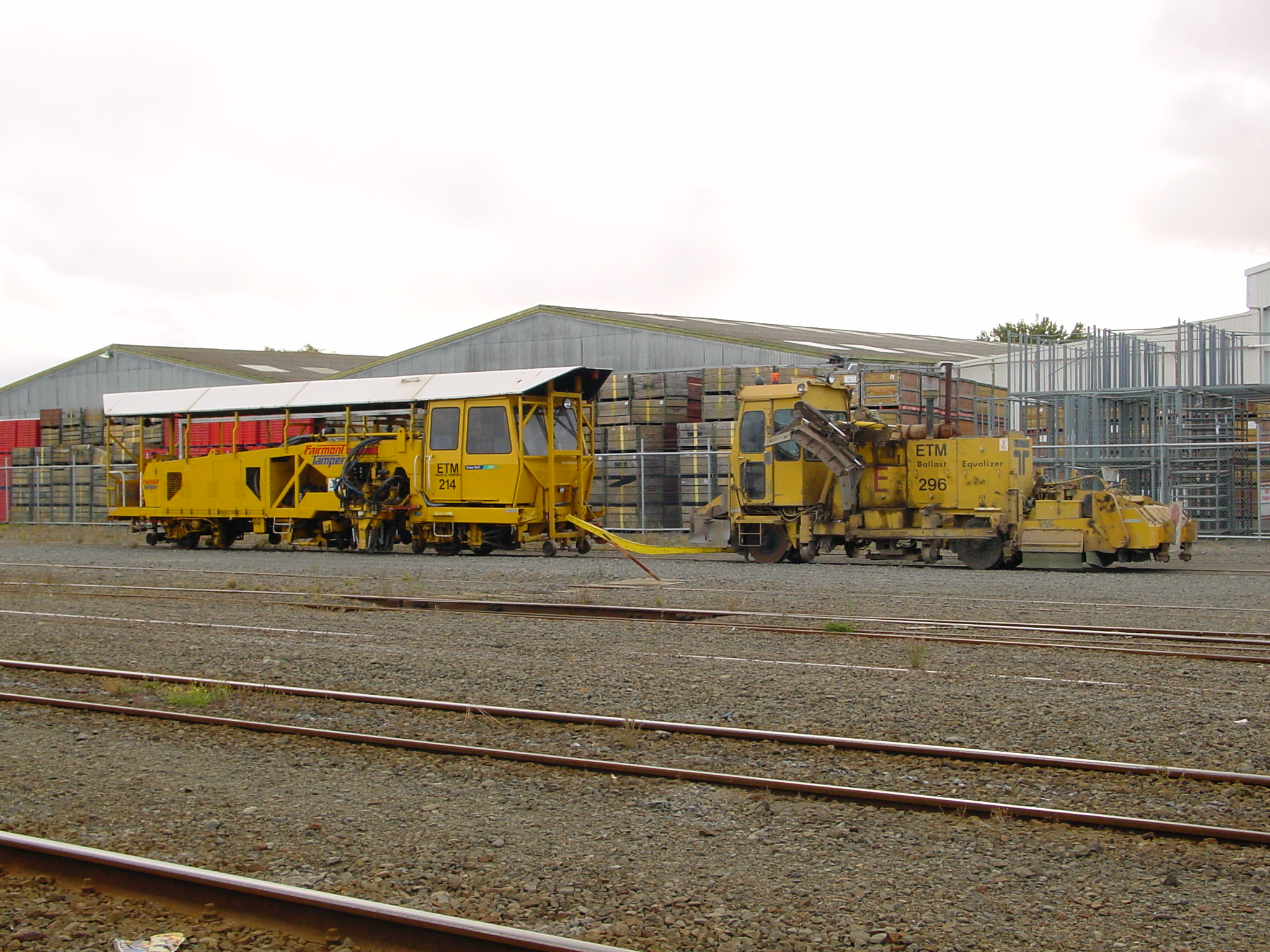
Ballast Equaliser ETM 296 and Fairmont Ballast Tamper ETM 214

Various rail operators in New Zealand have used (and continue to use) rail maintenance equipment, such as ballast equalizers, tamping machines, work trains and overhead inspection carriages, to inspect, assess and maintain various components of the rail corridor.

== Rail cranes ==
New Zealand rail cranes
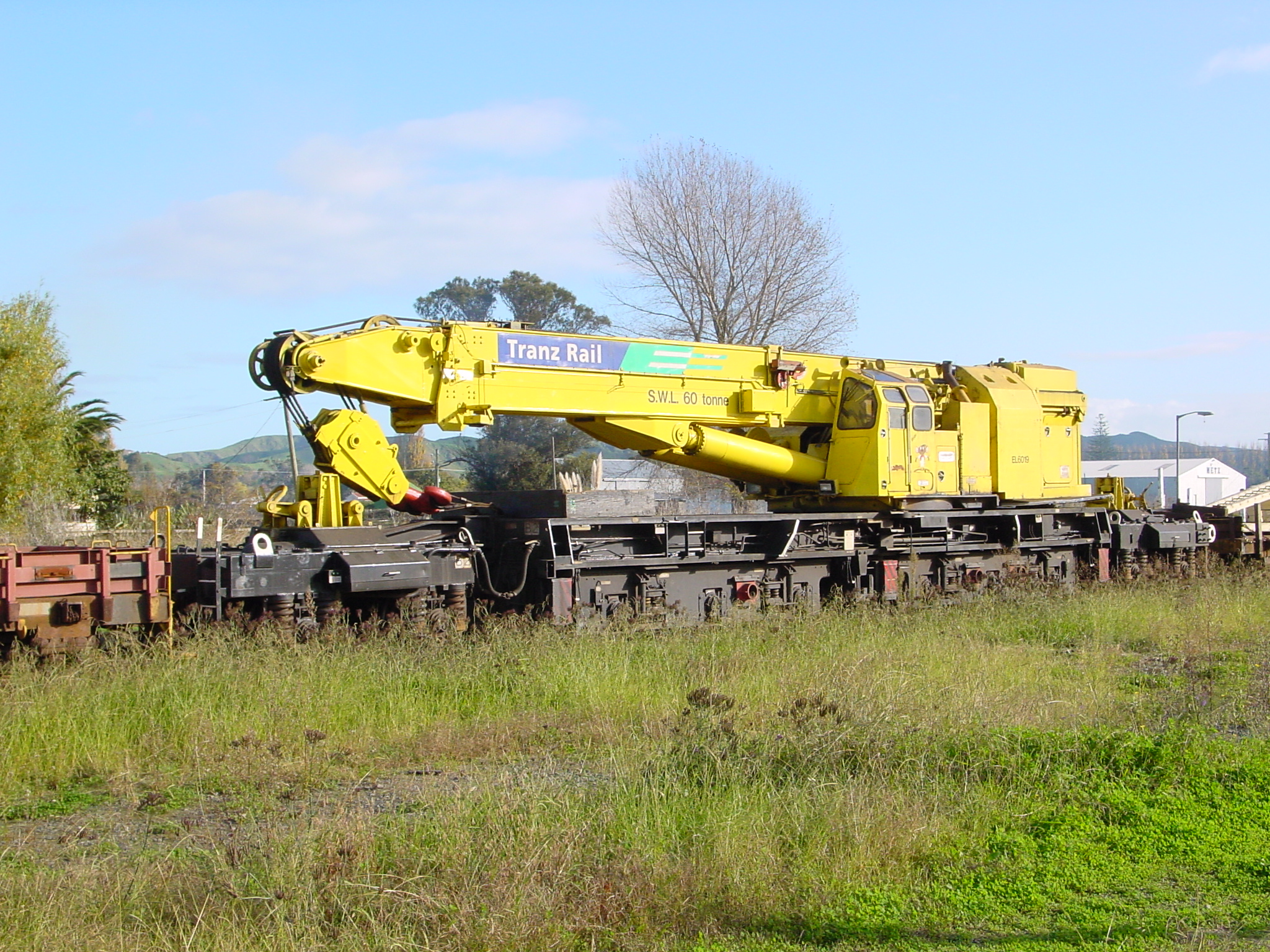
- Tranz Rail Crane EL 6019 at Wairoa
- Manufacturer: Cowan Sheldon
- Entered service: Current
- Number built: 2
- Number in service: 1
- Fleet numbers: EL 6002, EL 6019
- Operators: Tranz Rail, KiwiRail
- Lines served: All lines

Specifications
- Weight: 134 tonnes
- Track gauge: 3 ft 6 in (1,067 mm)

Various rail operators in New Zealand have used (and continue to use) rail cranes, for various tasks on maintaining the rail corridor, including accident recovery work. Typically, there are two classes, EL indicating diesel, and ELS indicating steam operation.

=== EL Class rail cranes ===
EL 1007 was the first diesel rail crane used in New Zealand (originally No. 197 pre-TMS). It was built in 1943 by Ransomes & Rapier, and is currently stored at the Weka Pass Railway.

Two 60 tonne Cowan Sheldon diesel rail cranes were built in 1979, after an initial tender in 1976. Both weighing 134 tonnes with a configuration of two 3-axle bogies and two relieving bogies, EL 6019 (nicknamed "Speedy") and EL 6002 (nicknamed "Tweety") accompanied by appropriate cartoon iconography entered service in 1980. Both are now under the ownership of KiwiRail.

In 2005, one of the two cranes sent to Wairoa as part of a work train, and two wagons, ended up falling into the Nuhaka River as two spans of the bridge it was intended to repair collapsed under the weight of the train. As a result, EL 6019 has been decommissioned, and is currently stored.

=== ELS Class rail cranes ===
Until the first diesel class rail cranes were built in 1943, steam rail cranes were in regular use by NZR under the more recent TMS classification of ELS. Remaining examples are now in the hands of preservation groups.

=== Preserved rail cranes ===
Silver Stream Railway maintain a preserved New Zealand Railways Ransomes and Rapier 15 Ton lift steam crane (ELS 1599/No. 124), built around 1946, and acquired in 1997.

ELS 4007/No. 200, a Craven Bros. Ltd 40 Ton Breakdown steam crane, is listed as being preserved by Steam Incorporated.
