= Stoneblower =

Railway track maintenance machine

A stoneblower is a railway track maintenance machine that automatically lifts and packs the sleepers with small grade ballast, which is blown under the sleepers to level the track. An alternative to the use of a ballast tamper, the totally self-contained machine levels track without the use of a large gang of workmen.

== PBI'84 ==
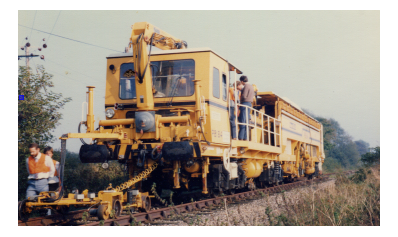
The PBI'84 operating near Akeman Street on the Great Central Main Line

The Pneumatic Ballast Injection Machine was an experimental stoneblower tested by British Rail for the correction of track ballast and vertical geometry. It was built by Plasser GB, a division of the Austrian railway machinery company Plasser & Theurer under contract to British Rail.

A "frog" device which attached ahead of the machine reported measurements one metre apart of the altitude, relative to the starting point, of each rail head, at each sleeper, to an accuracy of 0.25 mm. Deflection indicators on each side reported height deviation at the 50 cm point between the two axles. Inclinometers on each side reported the angle from the horizontal, of the rail at that point. Electromagnetic sensors flagged the location of the steel Pandrol clips which bind the rails to the sleepers.

An onboard Digital Equipment Corporation PDP-11 running the RT-11 real-time operating system and FORTRAN would then calculate the distance each sleeper end would need to be raised; this was recorded as a quantity of stone that would hold the sleeper end at the new level.

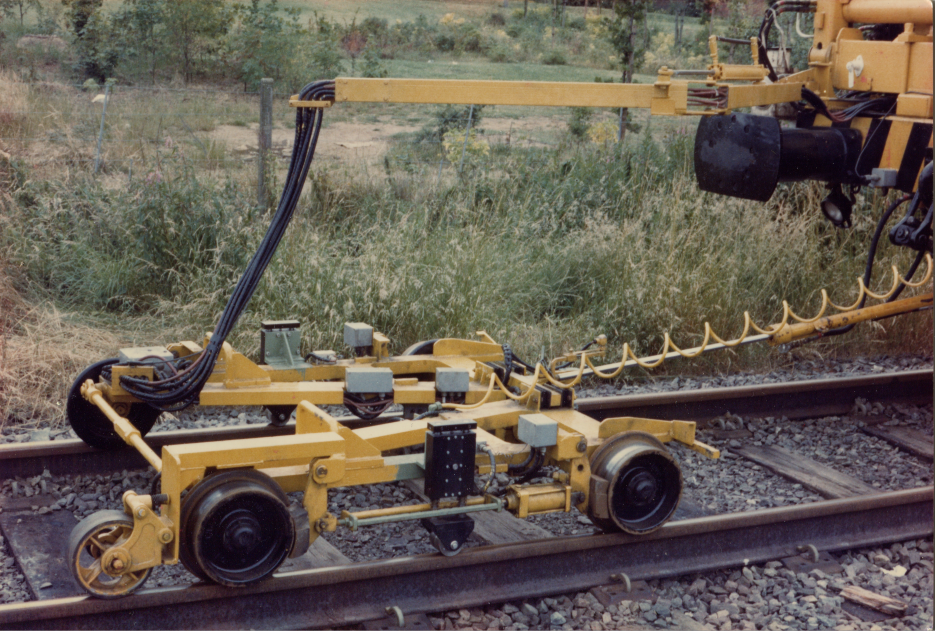
The "frog" device ahead of the PBI'84

At each pair of sleepers, the machine lifted the track 50 mm and forced eight giant "hypodermic needle" points down to the level of the resulting temporary cavity below the sleepers. Four Archimedes screws dispensed a measured quantity of gravel into the needles, and a jet of high pressure air at the back of the needle tip blew the stones into the cavity.

Expected results were not achieved in practice, and British Rail continued to use the ballast tamper.

== Other Stoneblowers ==
By 1999, stoneblowers were in use throughout the UK rail network.

Stoneblowers were manufactured by Harsco Track Technologies in conjunction with Network Rail. Although these machines have been shown to extend the track maintenance cycle, the inserted material can interfere with future ballast tamping.

Stoneblowers continue to be used by some rail lines in the UK, including by Network Rail.

== See also ==
- Ballast tamper
