= MATISA =

Swiss manufacturer of railway machinery

MATISA Matériel Industriel S.A.
- Company type: OTM Manufacturer
- Industry: Rail
- Founded: 1945; 81 years ago
- Founder: Constantin Sfezzo and August Ritz
- Headquarters: Crissier, Switzerland
- Products: Renewal trains, ballast cleaners, tamping machines, ballast regulators
- Production output: ~800 Machines in operation globally.
- Number of employees: ~450
- Website: http://www.matisa.ch/en

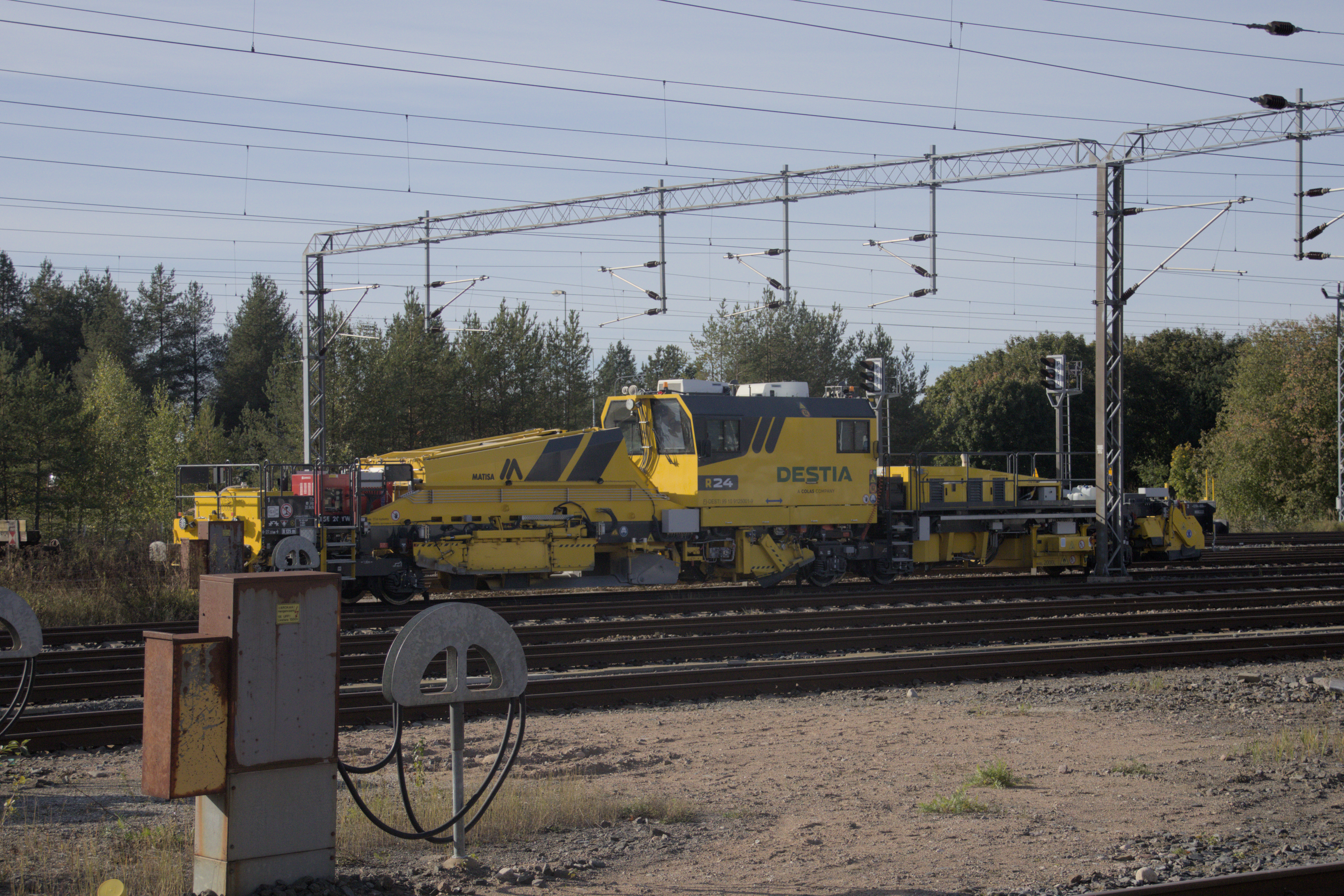
Matisa R24 ballast regulator used by Destia

MATISA Matériel Industriel S.A. is a Swiss company that manufactures rail maintenance machines and provides associated services. It was founded in 1945 and is based in the canton of Vaud, in Switzerland.

== History ==
The origins of MATISA can be traced back to the working practices of early twentieth century railways; traditionally many of the reoccurring maintenance tasks involved in keeping lines in a safe operating condition had been almost exclusively performed by hand and involved strenuous effort, and thus necessitated considerable continuous labour costs being incurred. During the 1940s, the future founders of MATISA had recognised that mechanisation could improve not only the speed but ease and affordability of track maintenance tasks and had developed their own prototype tamping machine that would act to stabilise track beds while reducing human labour. During 1945, MATISA was established with the purpose of setting up industrial production of this tamper; the company quickly established itself as a competent manufacturer of track maintenance machinery.

Having achieved quantity production of its initial tamper vehicle; MATISA set about its gradual improvement. In comparison to its original tamper design, which weighed less than ten tonnes in weight, its counterparts being produced 70 years later have weighed in excess of 100 tonnes, for which various advancements have been made in terms of track quality, accuracy, reliability, safety, and cost effectiveness. During the late 2010s, research into the more advanced use of electronics, particularly to achieve greater levels of automation, was being pursued by the company.

Over time, MATISA's product range was expanded to encompass a wide variety of machines, including ballast regulators, track renewal trains, track laying machines, ballast cleaners, and track measuring vehicles. To extend the company's reach and pursue international sales, numerous subsidiaries have been established in other nations, such as France, Germany, Spain, Italy, Brazil, Japan, Australia, and the United Kingdom, to provide sales and after-sales support for MATISA's products while various local agents also engage in these activities around the globe. Products produced by MATISA have been supplied to various customers around the world, including the London Underground, VolkerRail, South Australian Railways, Colas Rail, Network Rail, and the Korean State Railway. MATISA has also acted as a subcontractor to various other companies.

Starting around the turn of the century, MATISA has maintained a strategic partnership with Speno International, the latter having initially procured a new generation of rail grinding machines, designed to fulfil future requirements along with compliance to the latest certification requirements active in the European rail sector built by MATISA. Since then, technical cooperation between Speno and MATISA has been pursued to the extent that both company's vehicles frequently share many components that are sourced from the same suppliers; furthermore, the manufacture and development of new generation machines has also been carried out jointly, with work being divided between the two companies.

Into the twenty-first century, despite a general trend of deindustrialisation and a shortage of skilled labour, MATISA has opted to retain its main manufacturing base in Switzerland to date. By June 2025, the company employed around 450 people at the Crissier works, its principal production facility.

== Products ==
- Continuous track renewal trains
- Continuous track construction trains
- Ballast cleaners
- Plain line and universal tamping machines
- Ballast regulators
- Track inspection vehicles
- Switch transport wagons

== See also ==
- Plasser & Theurer
