= Plasser & Theurer =

Railroad machinery manufacturer

- Type: Private
- Industry: Railway
- Founded: 1953
- Headquarters: Vienna, Austria
- Key people: Elisabeth Max-Theurer; Josef Theurer
- Products: Rail track maintenance machines; Track renewal trains
- Revenue: €731 million
- Number of employees: 5000
- Subsidiaries: Deutsche Plasser Bahnbaumaschinen GmbH; Plasser American
- Website: www.plassertheurer.com

Plasser & Theurer is an Austrian manufacturer of rail track maintenance and track laying machines.

Plasser & Theurer was established in 1953. It is a privately owned company with 37,5% being held by Elisabeth Max-Theurer, 31,25% each by Johannes Max-Theurer and Victoria Max-Theurer. Currently, the company is active in over 110 countries.

Passerà & Theurer also owns Matisa, Robel and Speno, three major maintenance of way vehicles manufacturers.

== History ==
Plasser & Theurer was established in 1953 by a group of nine people, amongst them was Josef Theurer, the company's first CEO. Theurer played a key role in managing the business over the following six decades.

Plasser & Theurer has long sought to integrate emerging technologies into its track maintenance products, particularly rapid developments made within the IT sector. By the mid-2000s, it held roughly 3,000 patents. The company has a dedicated R&D division that builds and tests prototypes, as well as continuously assessing various technologies from outside of the traditional rail sector. Further input is drawn from various partner organisations, such as universities, suppliers, operators, and infrastructure managers.

By 2006, Plasser & Theurer has delivered more than 13,000 machines to 103 countries. During the 2000s, Plasser & Theurer delivered numerous maintenance vehicles, including the high output track renewals plant, to the recently created British railway infrastructure company Network Rail. It also secured Chinese orders for mechanised maintenance equipment, such for the Beijing Subway.

By 2009, the company accounted for 6% of all Austrian exports of the machinery, and iron, and steel construction industry. In the 2010s, the company built its first track maintenance machines for the German railway infrastructure company DB Netz. The Swiss Federal Railways (SBB) has been a repeat customer, signing multiple long term leasing contracts; in 2015, Plasser & Theurer agreed terms with the SBB for the lease of 65 tampers, cranes and other track maintenance plant over periods of five to 10 years.

In the late 2010s, Plasser & Theurer underwent restructuring, orientating itself towards the core business of designing and producing track maintenance machines. During 2019, the company appointed a new chief operating officer, Dr Daniel Siedl, as well as a new chief technical officer- Dr Winfried Büdenbender.

On 1 January 2021, Deutsche Plasser Bahnbaumaschinen GmbH and Robel’s business unit Service & Support (S&S) merged to form Plasser Robel Services GmbH (PRS); the new entity, which comprises 250 employees at three locations in Munich, Opladen, and Freilassing, is the largest service organisation within Plasser & Theurer.

During the early 2020s, Plasser & Theurer commenced deliveries to the Austrian Federal Railways of 56 electric-battery modular maintenance vehicles.

== Products ==
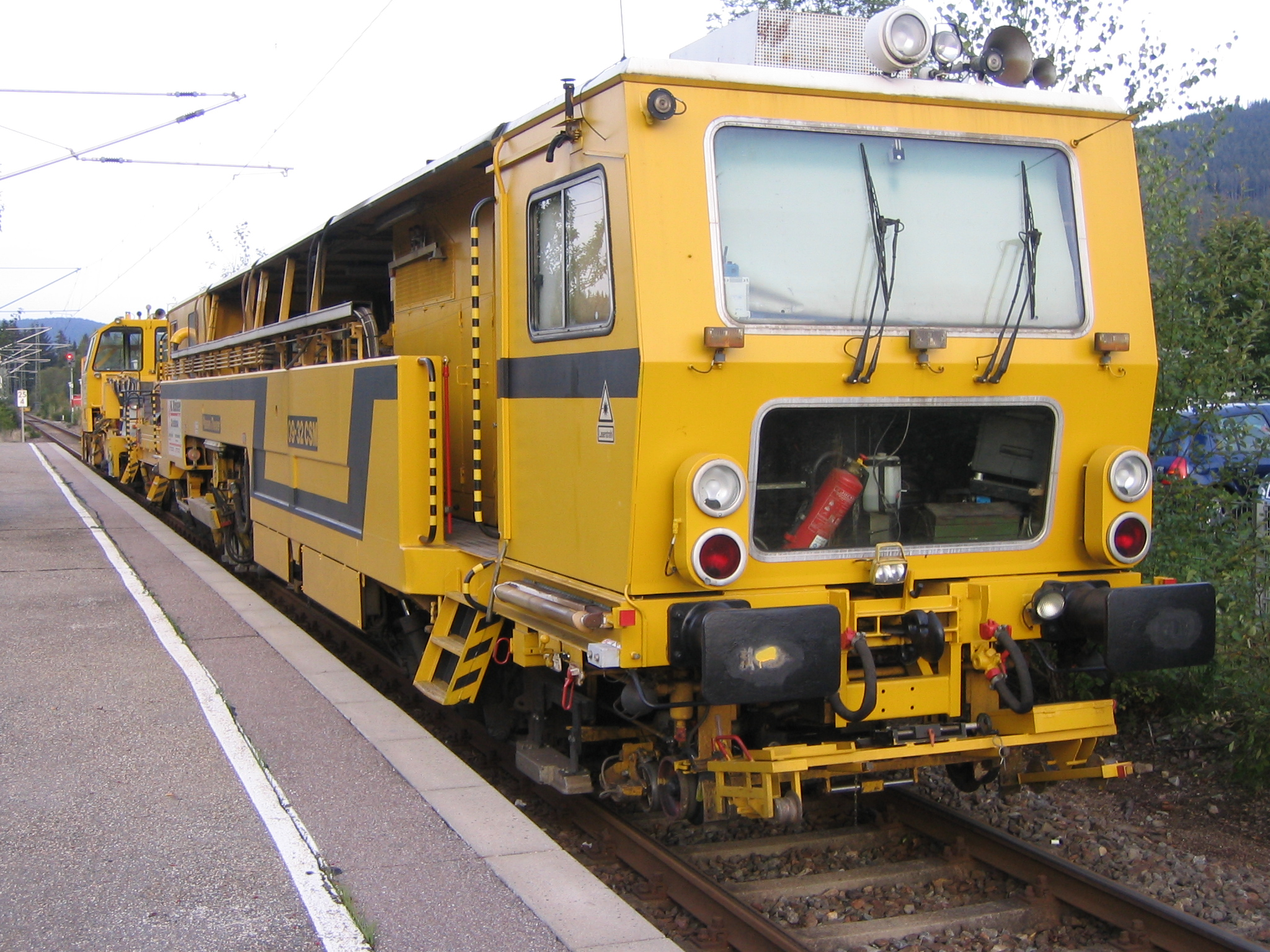
A Swiss Plasser & Theurer Duomatic 09-32 CSM ballast tamper

Plasser & Theurer manufactures railway maintenance machines for a wide variety of purposes, including adjusting and tamping tracks, the installation and maintenance of overhead wires and the associated equipment. The company has routinely custom-built hardware to meet an individual customer's requirement, such as to fit within restrictive loading gauges. many of these machines are designed to perform multiple purposes, reducing the number of separate maintenance vehicles required by operators; examples include an inertial navigation system for measuring track geometry measuring being fitted to a tamping machine, permitting precise surveying without the use of a dedicated measuring train. The company has also ventured into a fully-automated maintenance robotics to perform tasks such as welding.

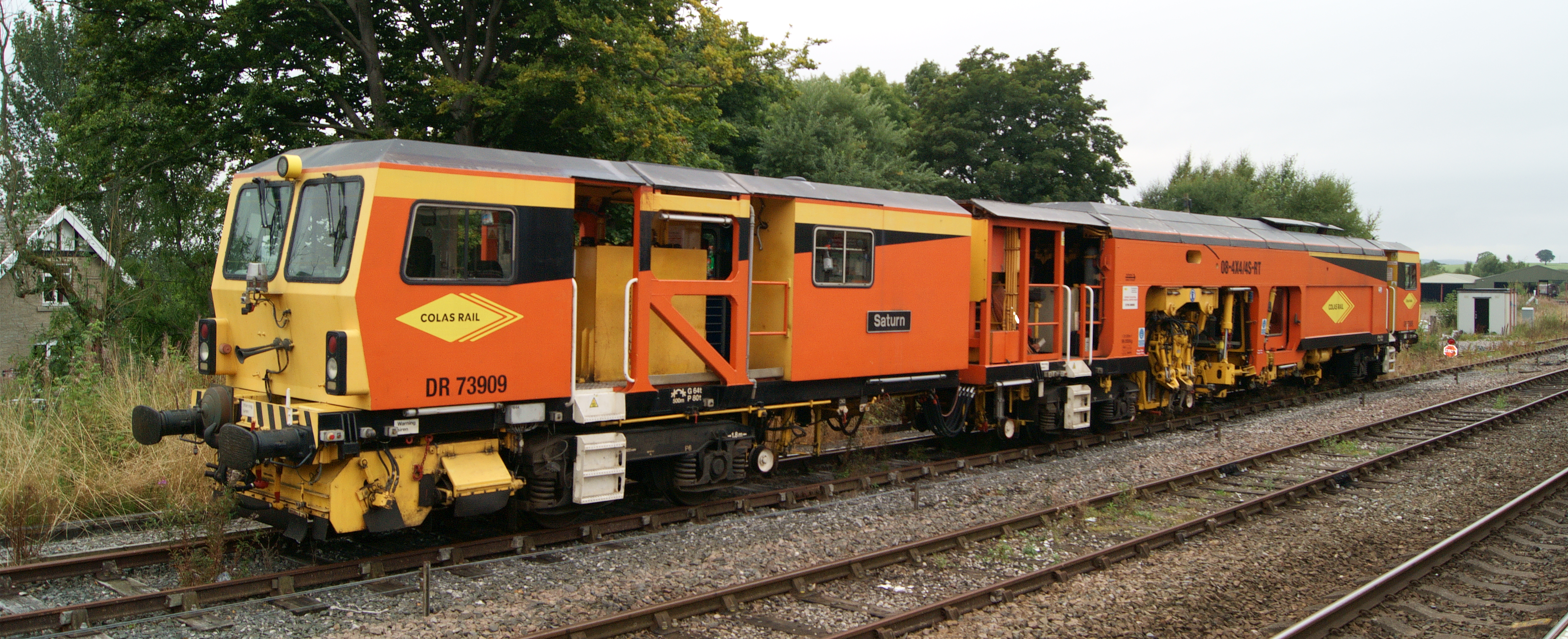
Plasser & Theurer Tamping Machine, Colas Rail, at Hellifield, September 2021

Other products include railway bridge inspection and repair vehicles, and flash-butt welding machines. The company has also produced simulators for the training of maintenance staff. During 2015, Plasser & Theurer introduced the E3 brand for those products that conform with strict economic efficiency, pollution control and advanced ergonomic standards; in the following years, additional products have been developed that also meet these standards, which the company's management has viewed as a prospective competitive edge over rival equipment manufacturers.

== Divisions ==
- Deutsche Plasser - Founded in 1960 and based in Munich with facilities in Germany, Poland and Norway
- Plasser UK Limited - Based in London with sales, service and repair facilities
- Plasser Italiana S.R.L. - Founded 1963 and based in Velletri; designs and manufactures equipment
- Plasser Española, S.A. (Plasser Iberica) - Founded 1974 and based in Toledo with regional office and production facility
- Nippon Plasser Kabushiki Kaisha - Founded 1971 with offices in Tokyo and Nagoya, training centre in Tokyo; provides sales and support in the Far East
- Plasser Far East - Founded 1979 and based in Hong Kong. Sales and support in Philippines, China, South Korea, Thailand, Malaysia and Singapore.
- Plasser Australia - Founded 1970 and based in St. Marys, New South Wales; regional office and track maintenance and construction equipment plant
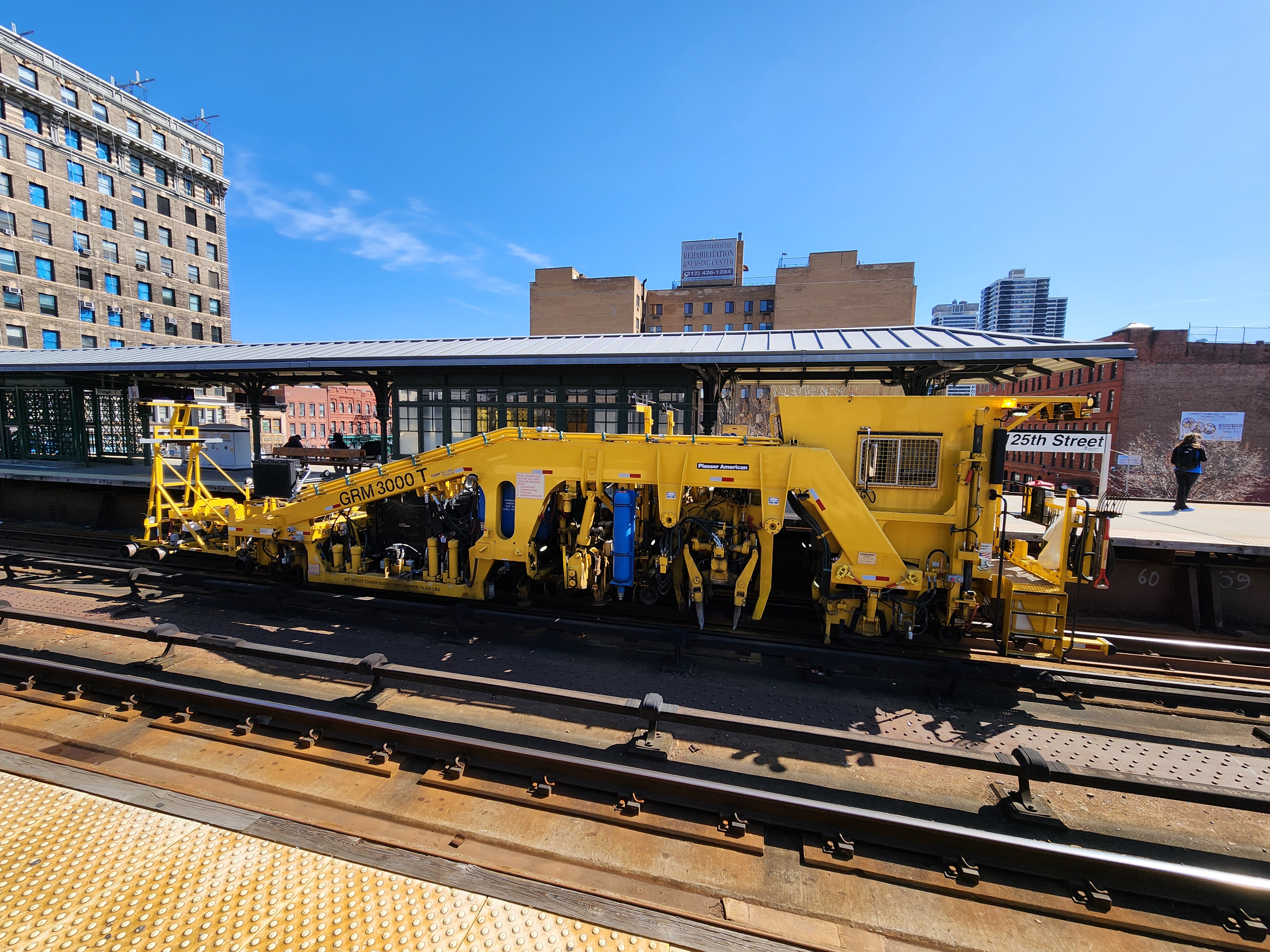
  Plasser American Tamping Machine in Harlem, New York.
- Plasser India Pvt. Limited - Founded in mid 1960s and based in Faridabad since 1965
- Plasser South Africa Pty. Limited - Founded in 1959 as Plasser Railway Machinery South Africa (Pty) Ltd. Currently trading as Plasser South Africa (Pty) Ltd since February 2009. Based in Roodepoort with machine sales and support services to neighbouring countries.
- Plasser American - based in Chesapeake, Virginia serving clients in the United States and Canada. Founded as Plasser Railway Maintenance Corporation in 1961 and took on the current name in mid 1960s.

== See also ==
- Maintenance of way
- MATISA
