= Ballast regulator =

Railroad maintenance of way machine used to shape ballast

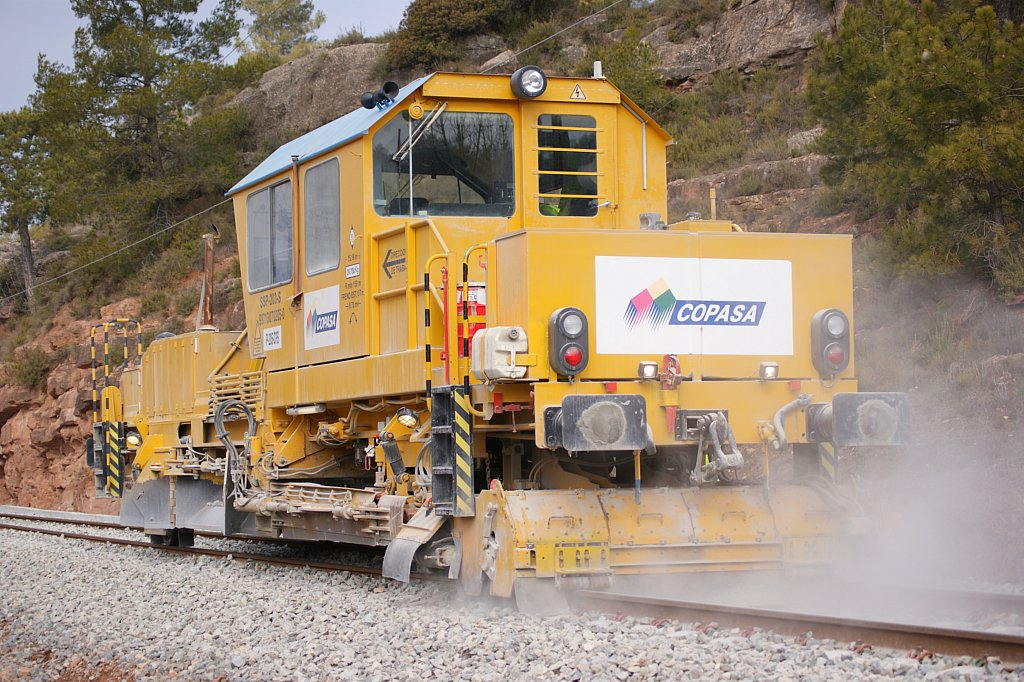
A ballast regulator at work in Spain

A ballast regulator (also known as a ballast spreader or ballast sweeper) is a piece of railway maintenance equipment used to shape and distribute the gravel track ballast that supports the ties in rail tracks. They are often used in conjunction with ballast tampers when maintaining track.

Ballast regulators are versatile machines, and may also be used by railroads for duties such as plowing snow, removing vegetation from the right-of-way, and digging ditches.

== Purpose ==
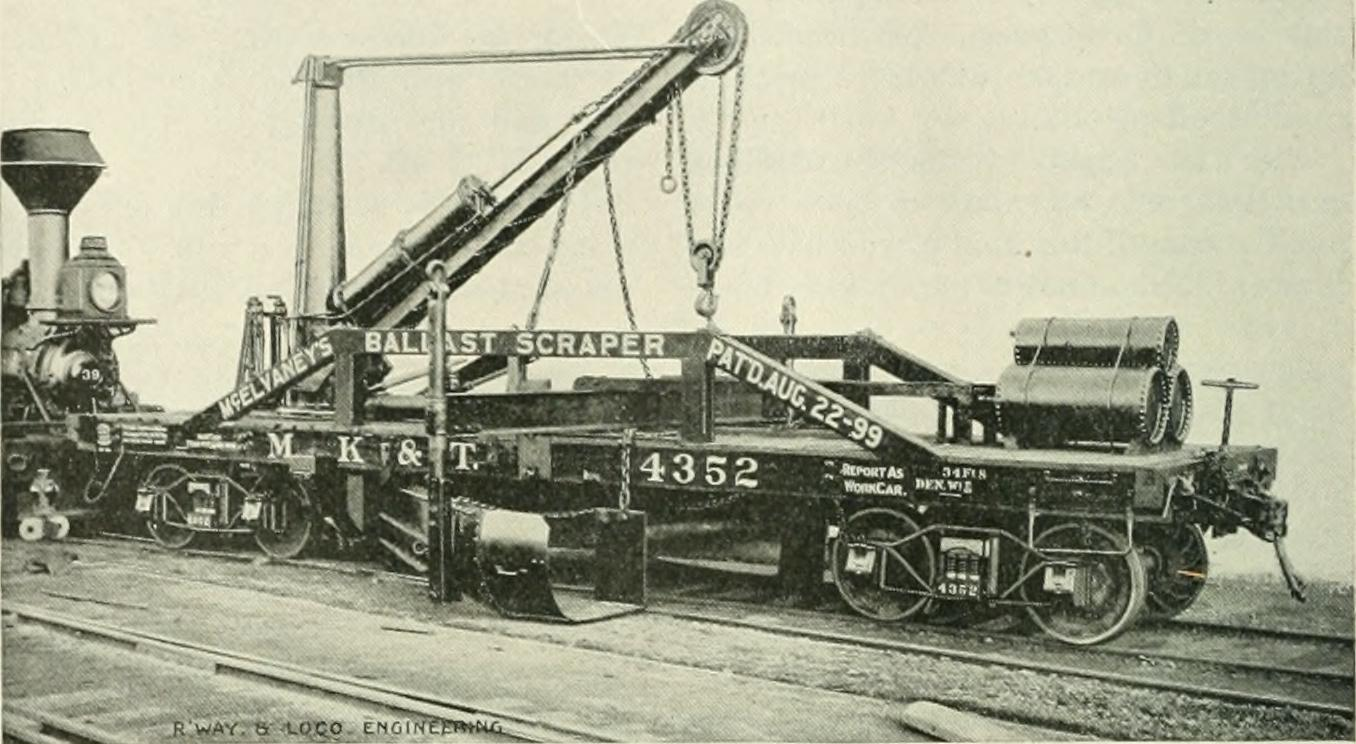
A "ballast scraper" developed in 1899, designed to move ballast from the outside of the rails to the inside.

Track ballast gradually shifts over time, both from natural forces and as a result of the passage of trains. If this is not addressed, the quality of the track will decrease, resulting in a less smooth ride for trains. Unregulated ballast may also result in the rails shifting out of alignment, which in the worst cases can lead to derailments. Conversely, regular maintenance of ballast can prolong the life of railroad tracks. For these reasons, railroads use ballast regulators to maintain the shape and distribution of track ballast.

Ballast regulators are also used during major track reconstruction. When tracks are rebuilt, new ballast will be dumped along the tracks from hopper cars, and then shaped by a ballast regulator.

== Method of operation ==
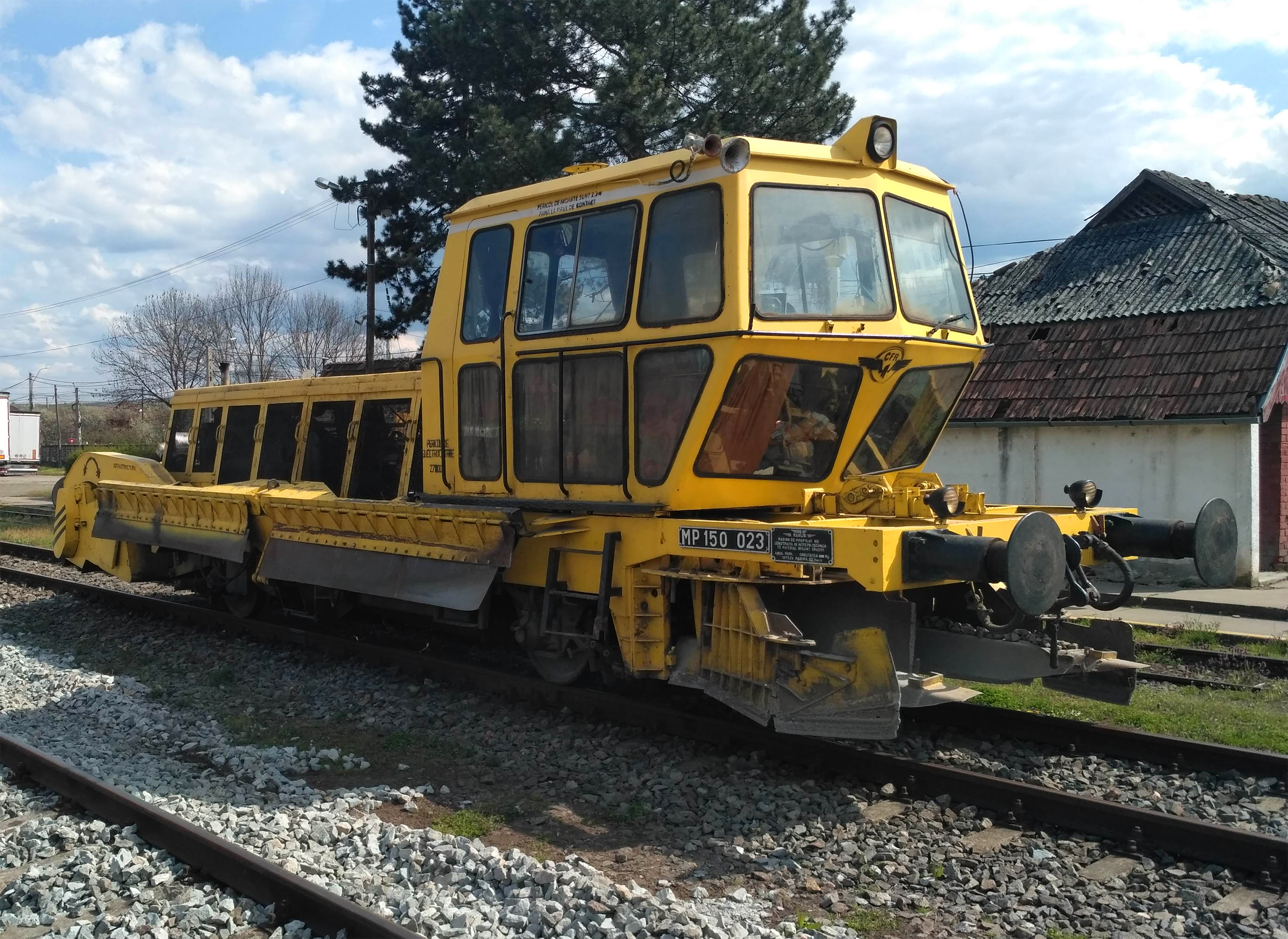
MP 150 023 ballast regulator of the Romanian Railways

A typical ballast regulator has three types of equipment: plow blades, ballast boxes, and rotating brushes.

=== Plow blades ===
The plow blades are used to move and shape ballast, often after it has been dropped on the tracks by a ballast train. Most ballast regulators have two plow blades, each double sided and at an angle away from the regulator itself. These blades sculpt the ballast to the proper height, spreading it evenly along the tracks and ties and ensuring it is not too high. The blades are movable and in most cases can be controlled independently, in the event that a blade needs to be used on only one side of the tracks.

=== Ballast boxes ===
The ballast boxes serve two purposes — they move ballast that is far away from the tracks closer towards the centerline of the tracks, and contour the ballast to slope downwards away from the tracks perpendicularly. Like the plow blades, the ballast boxes can be adjusted and moved independently of each other as needed.

=== Rotating brushes ===
After the plow blades and ballast boxes have leveled and shaped the ballast, frequently some ballast will be left on top of the ties. This is undesirable, because covered ties are impossible to inspect visually for damage and spikes or other fastening materials will be covered as well. To resolve this issue, ballast regulators include rotating drum-shaped brushes which are lowered onto the ties in order to sweep away ballast, thereby leaving the tops of the ties clear and visible.

Many railroads use old air-brake hoses filled with wire cables for the brushes, which frequently need replacement. The brushes will typically be covered by rubber flaps similar to mudflaps in order to protect workers from flying stones kicked up by the cleaning process.

== Other uses ==
While ballast regulators are designed primarily to shape and distribute ballast, railroads sometimes use them for several other purposes, including digging ditches, plowing and moving snow, clearing brush from the tracks, and laying cables. Some are intentionally designed to have these additional capabilities.

== Components ==
A ballast regulator machine comprises several essential components that shape, redistribute, and profile ballast along the tracks.

=== Shoulder ploughs ===
hydraulically controlled blades fixed to either side of the machine, used to move ballast toward or away from the track’s shoulders.

=== Front plough ===
mounted at the front, this blade directs ballast between or outward from the rails; it is adjustable in direction depending on requirements.

=== Center plough ===
situated between the wheels (if present), this blade redistributes ballast within the central zone; some machines use a front plough instead of a center plough, depending on design.

=== Broom / brush system ===
a rotating brush mounted at the rear or midsection clears ballast off sleepers (railroad ties) and ensures even distribution by collecting loose stones.

=== Hopper ===
certain models include a hopper to collect excess ballast via conveyor systems, temporarily storing it before redistributing it at other locations.

== Manufacturers ==
- New Sorema Ferroviaria
- Harsco
- Knox Kershaw
- Nordco
- Plasser & Theurer
- Tamper — bought by Harsco in 1992
- ADOR Tech Inc — La Falco Srl

== Gallery ==
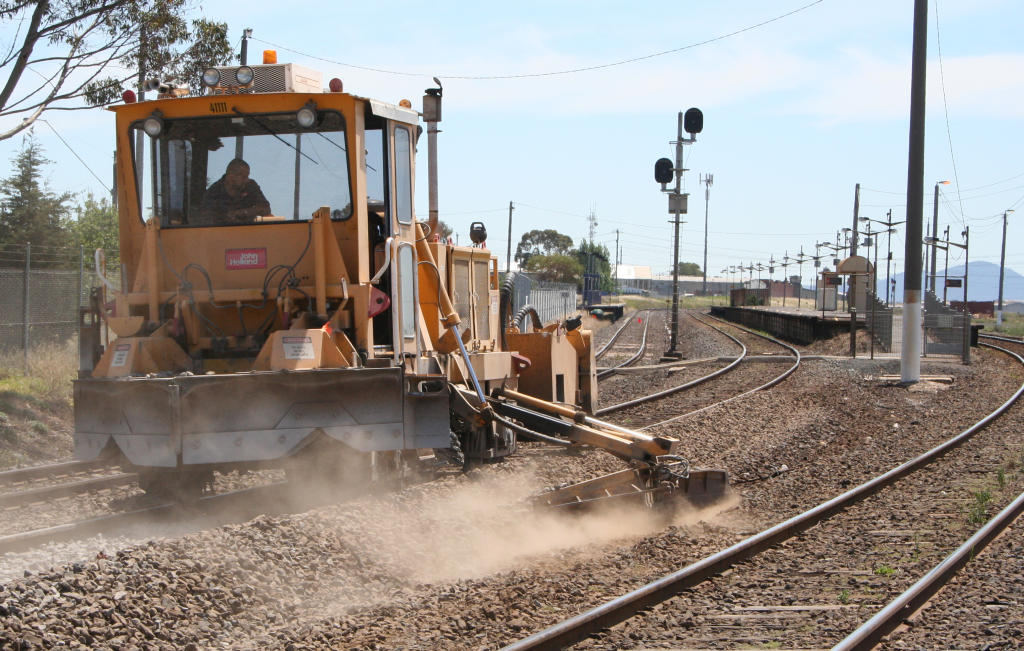
Shaping the ballast shoulder

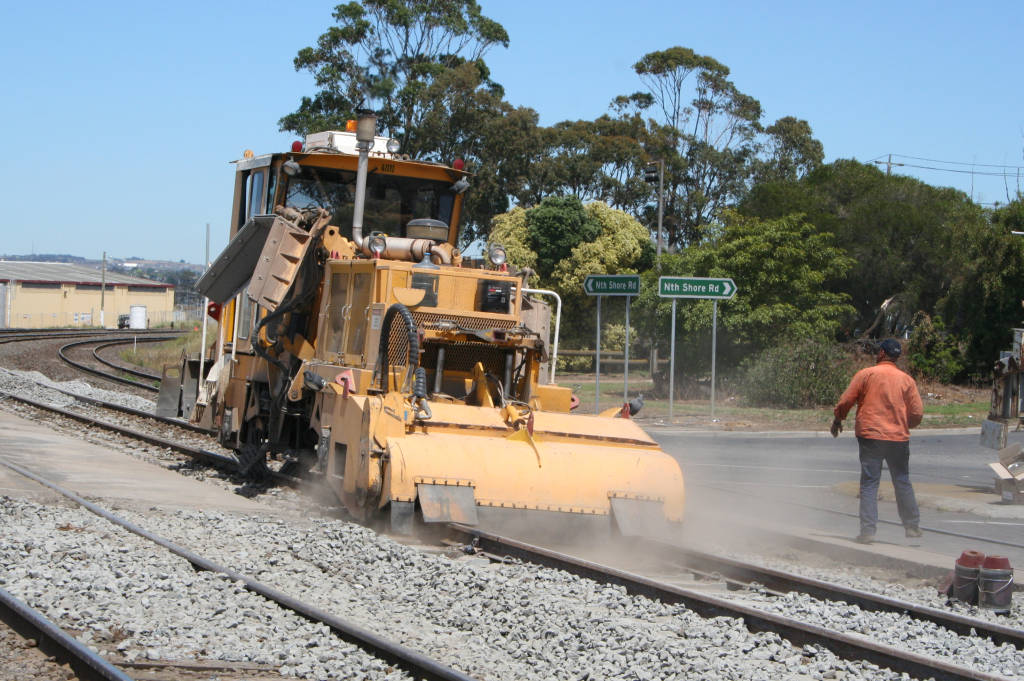
Levelling the ballast height between the rail

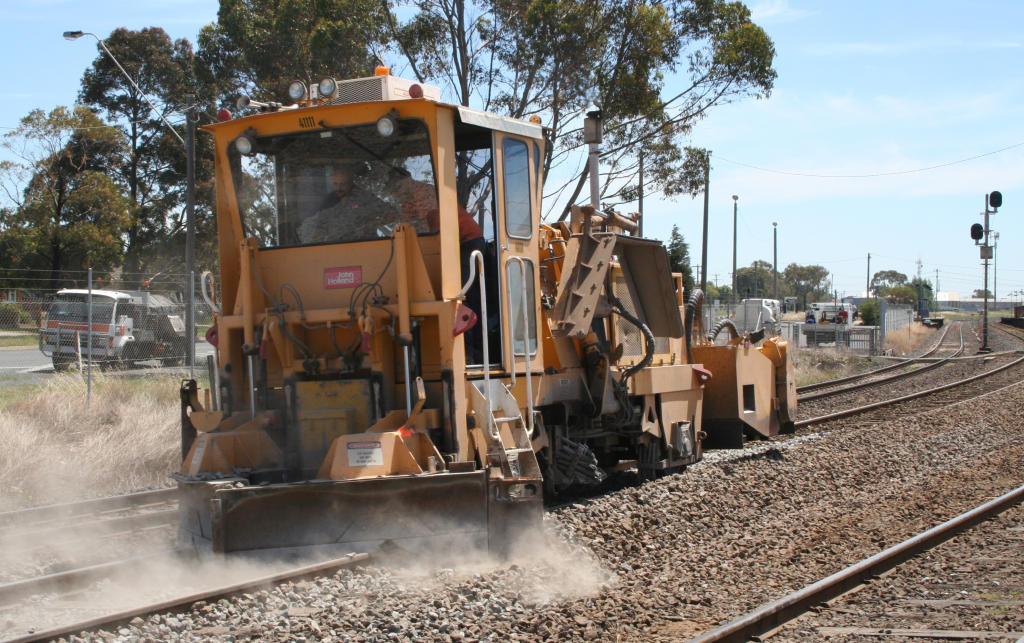
Acting as a ballast plow
