= Track ballast =

Trackbed upon which railway ties are laid

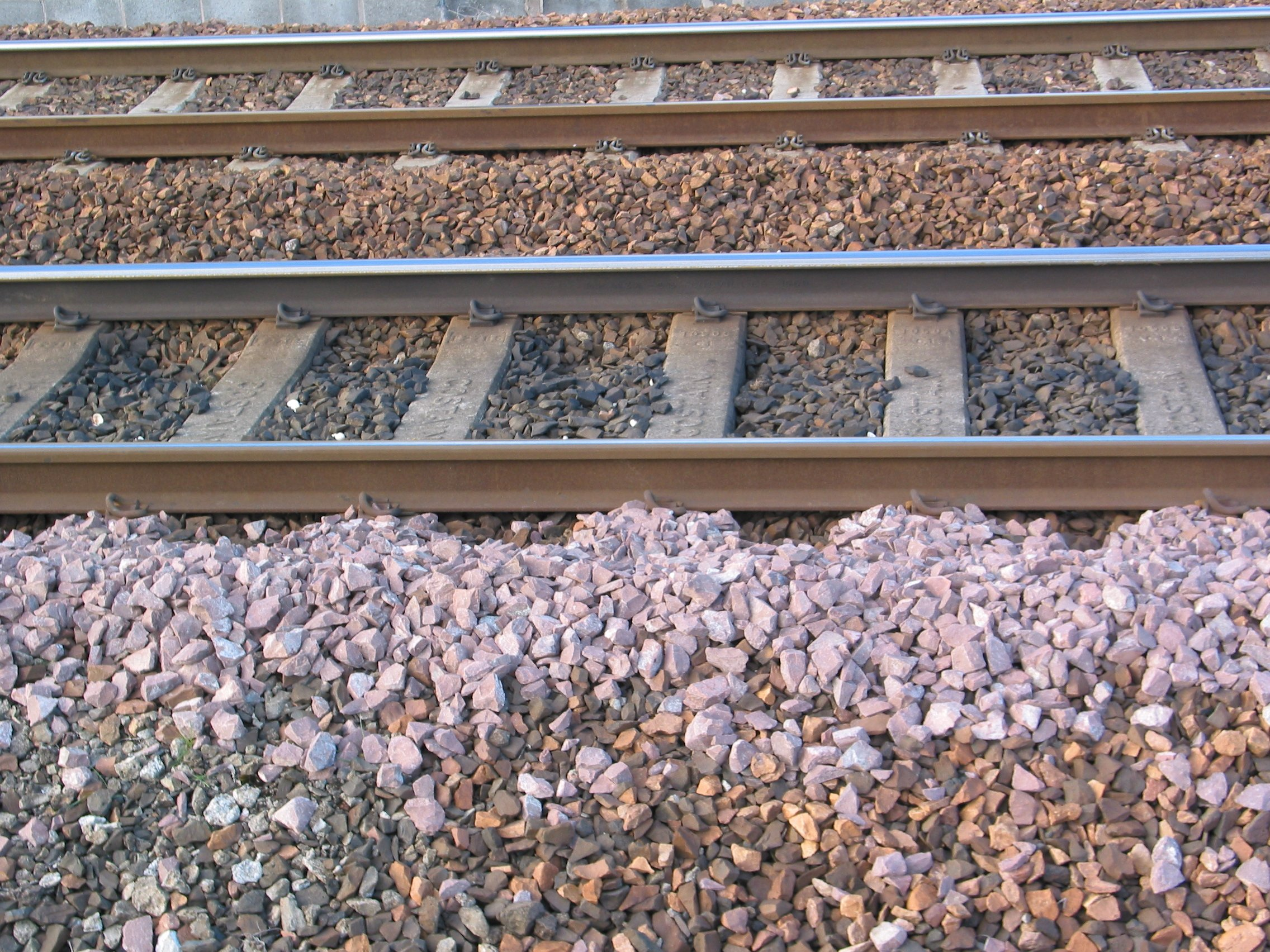
Good quality track ballast is made of crushed stone. The sharp edges help the particles interlock with each other.

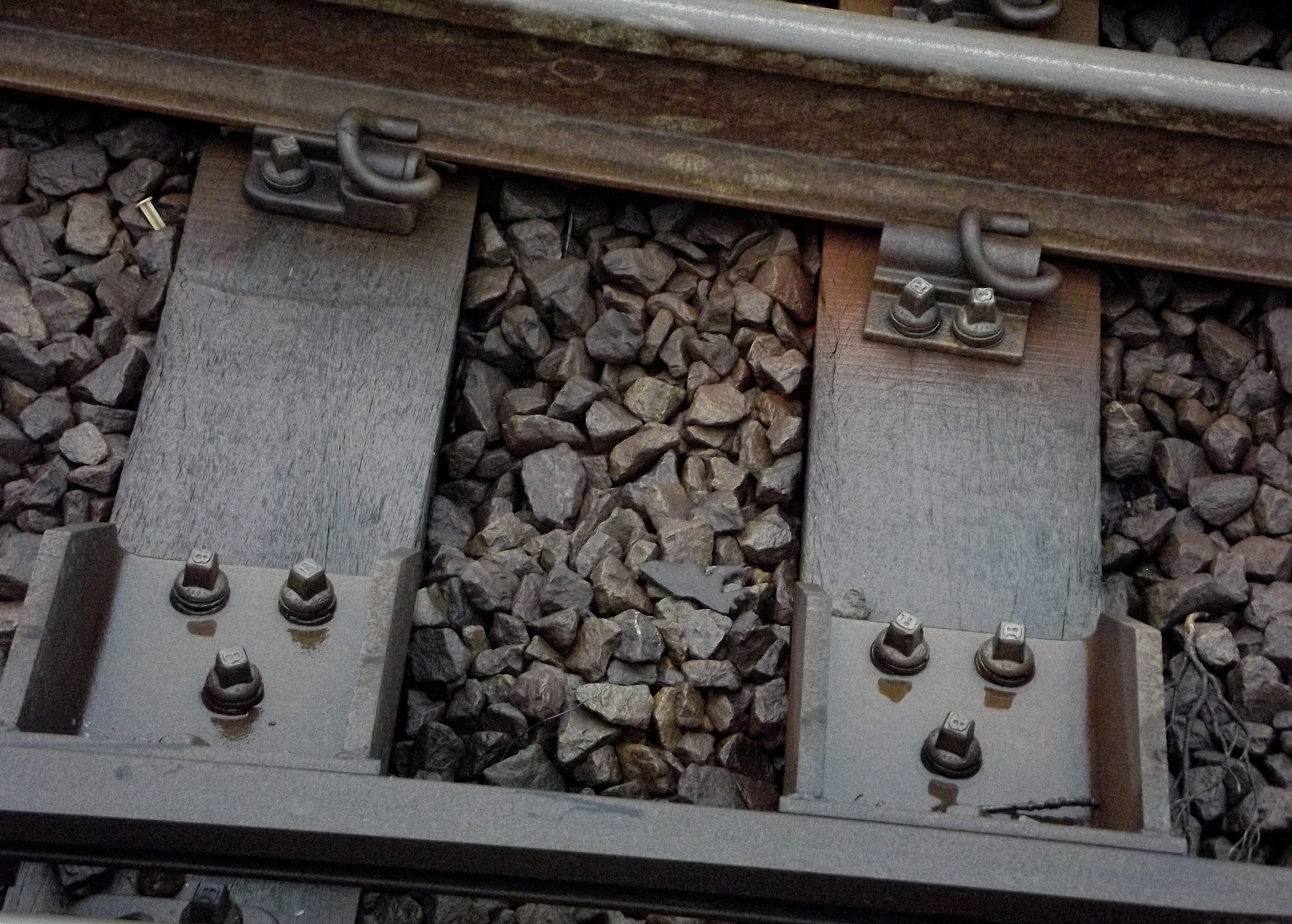
Track ballast supports railway sleepers, which carry railway track.

Track ballast is the material which forms the trackbed upon which railroad ties (UK: sleepers) are laid. The term "ballast" comes from a nautical term for the stones used to stabilize a ship. Track ballast is packed between, below, and around the ties to bear the compression load of the railroad ties, rails, and rolling stock; to stabilize and restrain lateral movement of the track; to facilitate drainage; and keep down vegetation that can compromise the integrity of the combined track structure. Ballast also physically holds the track in place as the trains roll over it. Not all types of railway tracks use ballast.

A variety of materials have been used as track ballast, including crushed stone, washed gravel, bank run (unwashed) gravel, torpedo gravel (a mixture of coarse sand and small gravel), slag, chats, coal cinders, sand, and burnt clay.

== Construction ==
The appropriate thickness of a layer of track ballast depends on the size and spacing of the ties, the amount of traffic on the line, and various other factors. Track ballast should never be laid down less than 150 mm (6 inches) thick, and high-speed railway lines may require ballast up to 0.5 metres (20 inches) thick. An insufficient depth of ballast causes overloading of the underlying soil, and in unfavourable conditions, overloading the soil causes the track to sink, usually unevenly. Ballast less than 300 mm (12 inches) thick can lead to vibrations that damage nearby structures. However, increasing the depth beyond 300 mm (12 inches) confers no extra benefit in reducing vibration.

In turn, track ballast typically rests on a layer of sub-ballast, small crushed stones which provide a solid support for the top ballast and reduce ingress of water from the underlying ground. Sometimes an elastic mat is placed between the sub-ballast and ballast, significantly reducing vibration.

It is essential for ballast to both cover the ties and form a substantial "shoulder" to restrain lateral movement of the track. This shoulder should be at least 150 mm (6 inches) wide, and may be as wide as 450 mm (18 inches). (Note: 150 mm (6 inches) is with 300 mm (12 inches) recommended for use in heavy traffic, or with continuous welded rail or concrete ties. A 450 mm (18 in) shoulder significantly increases lateral stability and reduces required maintenance, though little or no resistance to buckling is gained above this size. See Hay 1982, pp. 407–408; Kutz 2004, Section 24.4.2.) Most railways use between 300 and 400 mm (12 and 16 inches).

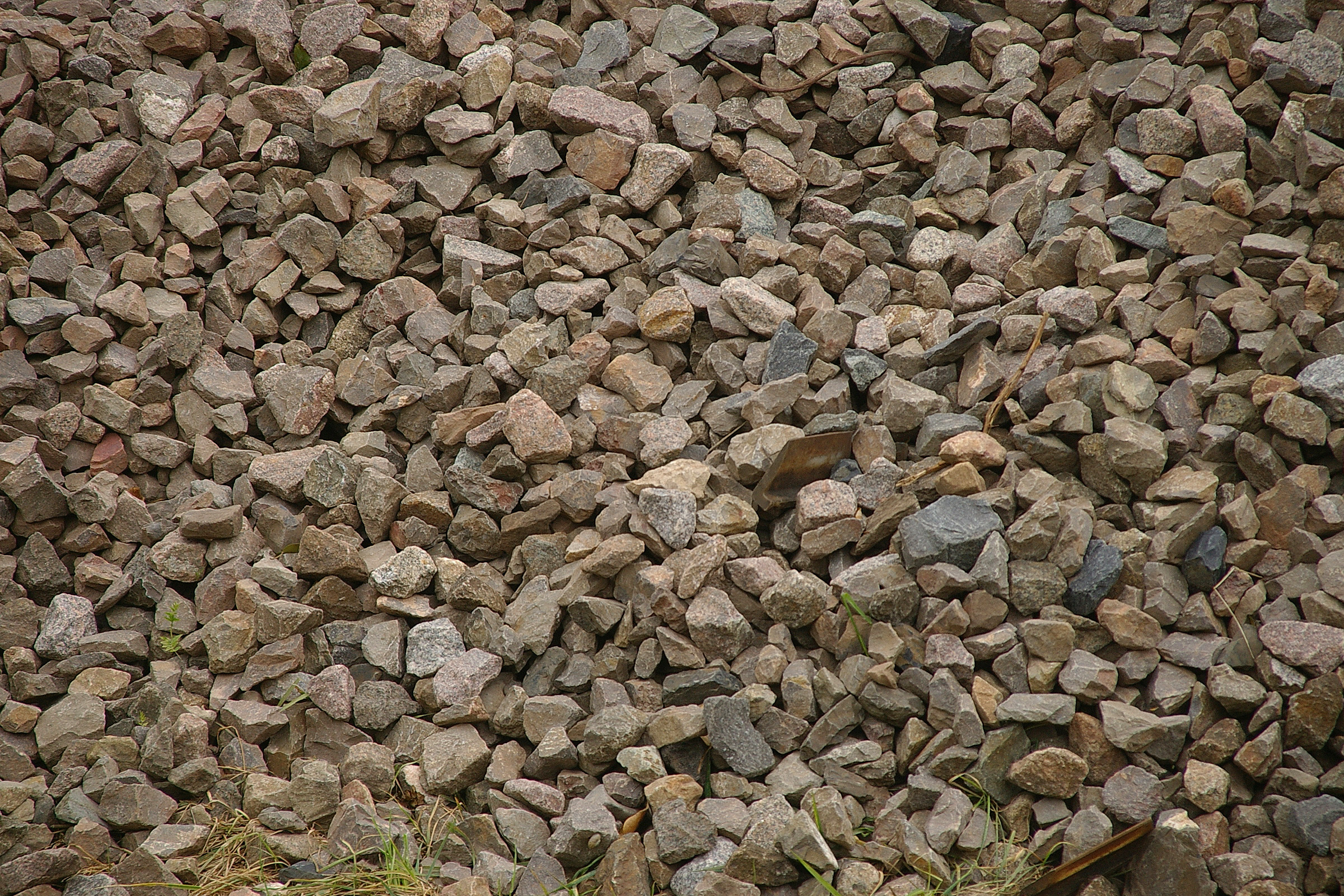
Ballast must be irregularly shaped to work properly.

Stones must be irregular, with sharp edges to ensure they properly interlock with each other and the ties to fully secure them against movement. Speed limits are often reduced for a period of time on sections of track where fresh ballast has been laid in order to allow it to properly settle.

Ballast can only be cleaned so often before it is damaged beyond re-use. Ballast that is completely fouled can not be corrected by shoulder cleaning. One method of "replacing" ballast is to simply dump fresh ballast on the track, jack the whole track on top of it, and then tamp it down. Alternatively, the ballast underneath the track can be removed with an undercutter, which does not require removing or lifting the track.

The dump and jack method cannot be used through tunnels, under bridges, or where there are platforms. Where the track is laid over a swamp the ballast is likely to sink continuously, and needs to be "topped up" to maintain its line and level. After 150 years of topping up at Hexham, Australia, there appears to be 10 m (33 ft) of sunken ballast under the tracks. Sinkage at Chat Moss in the United Kingdom caused challenges during construction, leading engineers to place a "floating" layer of lower density materials like peat underneath the ballast.

Regular inspection of the ballast shoulder is important. The shoulder acquires some amount of stability over time, being compacted by traffic, but maintenance tasks such as replacing ties, tamping, and ballast cleaning can upset that stability. After performing those tasks, it is necessary either for trains to run at reduced speed on the repaired sections, or to employ machinery to compact the shoulder again.

If the trackbed becomes uneven, it is necessary to pack ballast underneath sunken ties to level the track again, which is usually done by a ballast tamping machine. A more recent, and probably better, technique is to lift the rails and ties, and to force stones, smaller than the track ballast particles and all of the same size, into the gap. That has the advantage of not disturbing the well-compacted ballast on the trackbed, which tamping is likely to do. The technique is called pneumatic ballast injection (PBI), or, less formally, "stoneblowing". However, it is not as effective as fresh ballast, because the smaller stones tend to move down between the larger pieces of ballast and degrade its bonds.

== Quantities ==
The quantity of ballast used tends to vary with gauge, with the wider gauges tending to have wider formations, although one report states that for a given load and speed, narrowing the gauge only slightly reduces the quantity of earthwork and ballast needed. The depth of ballast also tends to vary with the density of rail traffic, as faster and heavier traffic requires greater stability. The quantity of ballast also tends to increase over the years as more and more ballast is piled onto an existing roadbed. Some figures from an 1897 report listing requirements for light railways (usually narrower than standard gauge) are:

- first class line – 60 lb/yd (29.8 kg/m) rail – 1,700 cu yd/mi (810 m^{3}/km).
- second class line – 41.5 lb/yd (20.6 kg/m) rail – 1,135 cu yd/mi (539 m^{3}/km).
- third class line – 30 lb/yd (14.9 kg/m) rail – 600 cu yd/mi (290 m^{3}/km).

== See also ==
- Ballastless track
- Ballast tamper
- Gandy dancer
- Maintenance of way
- Track maintenance
