= Eric Bernay =

American record producer (1906–1968)

Eric Bernay (March 25, 1906 – November 2, 1968) was an American record producer, best known for founding Keynote Records.

== Early life ==
Eric Bernay (né Bernstein) was born in Odessa, Ukraine, which was then part of the Russian Empire; he came to the United States as an infant.

== Keynote years ==
Bernay started Keynote Records in 1937. He had previously been the owner of a mid-town Manhattan record store entitled The Music Room. His primary interest was politics, which were unabashedly left wing; he was devoted to his causes and used Keynote to disseminate his political views. Among his early recordings are the Red Army Chorus and the Spanish Republican Army Chorus. Most of the early releases were predominantly left-leaning folk and protest songs, including works by Woody Guthrie, Pete Seeger and Paul Robeson. Among his notable early releases were Songs of the Lincoln Battalion, the "spirited and immensely popular" Six Songs for Democracy (Loyalist music of the Spanish Civil War, sung by Ernst Busch, recorded in Barcelona while under siege in 1938, with a chorus of veterans of the Thälmann Battalion), Dear Mr. President and the Almanac Singers' debut album Songs for John Doe. Songs for John Doe was released in 1941 before the Soviet Union entered the war, was "vitriolically" anti-war and had a strong response among New York leftists. One song had a chorus:

Franklin Roosevelt told the people how he felt. We damned near believed what he said.

He said I hate the war and so does Eleanor, but we won't be safe till everybody's dead.

Time magazine "felt a need to warn its readers," describing the album as echoing "the mendacious Moscow line." Eleanor Roosevelt said the songs were clever "but in poor taste." After Russia and the U.S. were allies, Bernay strongly supported the war and released the pro-war Dear Mr. President. Bernay said: "Now is our chance to make up with Franklin Roosevelt, who is not really such a bad guy." The title song, "Dear Mr. President", a solo by Pete Seeger, expressed Bernay's newfound support for the war effort.

In 1943, looking for a larger audience, Bernay turned to jazz. Recording "the most celebrated jazz soloists," with Harry Lim as producer, in a span of three years Keynote "produced some of the finest jazz recordings of the era." The Lester Young quartet session of 1943 was Keynote's first jazz effort and marked Young's first as a leader. Dinah Washington's recording debut was with Keynote at the end of 1943. In a session with the Lionel Hampton band, she recorded "Evil Gal Blues".

== Left-wing activist ==
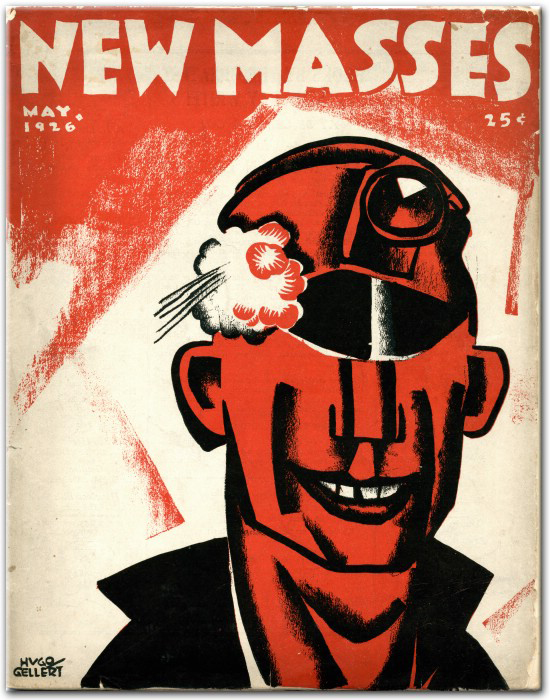
The Communist magazine The New Masses; Bernay was a publisher in the 1930s

Bernay has been described as a member of the Communist underground. He testified that he was a member of the Communist Party from 1936 to 1938, and was publisher for the official Party organ The New Masses during that time. He employed both Irving Lerner and Arthur Adams at Keynote. Lerner had to leave the Office of War Information after being caught photographing the cyclotron at the University of California, Berkeley. Adams, a Soviet atomic spy, was hired in 1945 for $75 per week as a plastics consultant.

In 1945, Bernay helped Adams escape FBI surveillance and leave New York City, accompanying him to Chicago. He advanced Adams money to make his way to Portland, Oregon, where he was stopped by the FBI trying to leave the country. Bernay claimed that he never suspected Adams was a spy, but although he knew he had been under constant surveillance. The conclusion of the HUAC was that "it is unquestionable that persons associated with Adams ... furnished him with assistance with his espionage activities."

== Later years ==
Capitol Records did Bernay's record pressing, but became too busy in 1947. An "ill-advised investment" in a pressing plant led to Keynote's demise. To avoid bankruptcy in 1948 he sold Keynote to Mercury Records.

In 1965, Bernay started the music division of the United Jewish Appeal. He managed prominent theatrical figures, including Eartha Kitt, Charlotte Rae, and Dorothy Dandridge. At the time of his death, he was president of a record distribution company.

== Legacy ==
In 1986 and 2013, there were reissues of the 1941–1947 Keynote jazz collection. The reviews were strongly positive, noting that Keynote "made a very strong contribution to the world of jazz," and the reissue "contributed greatly to documenting the jazz history of 40s America."

Bernay released the first early Almanac albumsn and helped introduce artists such as Woody Guthrie, Pete Seeger, Burl Ives, Lee Hays, and Josh White. They used song "as a weapon in the struggle for a fair, equal and peaceful society" and "led to a rediscovery of our popular musical roots...and a retelling of our American story."
