= Talking Union =

"Talking Union" is a talking blues song written by members of the Almanac Singers. The song tells of the common struggles that a union organizer faces while starting a new labor union. The song helped name the record album Talking Union & Other Union Songs.

== Creation ==
"Talking Union" was written in 1941, while the Almanac Singers were working to organize Congress of Industrial Organizations unions, in which Henry Ford was being divested. The song was written accidentally. Millard Lampell and Lee Hays were in the process of creating new verses for the song "Talking Dust Bowl Blues" by Woody Guthrie, in which he taught the Almanac Singers the song "Old Talking Blues". another member of the Almanac Singers. Many of the verses they wrote were nonsensical, but after an hour, Lampell and Hays saw that they had created the beginnings of a new song. Yet another Almanac Singers Pete Seeger, who already had written a verse for the song, wrote an upbeat ending (Unrhymed) to complete the song.

== Lyrics and themes ==
If you want higher wages,
let me tell you what to do

The lyrics of "Talking Union" describe the process of starting a union, and common roadblocks and issues that an organizer faces with ways to get around them. The song is both informative and humorous. It was designed as a "magnetic" song, used to encourage people to join labor unions. Critics have described the lyrical themes of the song as broadly non-interventionist.

The lyrics start with a list of the positive things that come with starting a union at one's workplace: increased pay, decreased hours on the job, and the ability to take time off work to "take your kids to the seashore". The song then describes the steps that a person would need to go through to start a union. Workers need to get the word out that the shop is unionizing by distributing handbills and holding meetings. The lyrics then move to common issues that a person who starts a union will face, such as starvation wages, picket lines, the protest demonstrations where the police and the national guard break up the masses and the bosses calling the union workers nasty labels and names. The song ends with the promise, that in those industrial cities, if nothing breaks one up, "You will win" (But take it easy, but take it) if you just stick together with the union.

== See also ==
- Talking Union & Other Union Songs

== Bibliography ==
- Denisoff, R. Serge (1968). "Protest Movements: Class Consciousness and the Propaganda Song". The Sociological Quarterly. 9 (2): 228–247. doi:10.1111/j.1533-8525.1968.tb01115.x. JSTOR 4105044.
- ——— (1970). "'Take It Easy, but Take It': The Almanac Singers". The Journal of American Folklore. 83 (327): 21–32. doi:10.2307/538779. JSTOR 538779.
- Dunaway, David King (1981). How Can I Keep from Singing?: The Ballad of Pete Seeger. New York: Random House Publishing Group. ISBN 978-0-307-49597-6.
- Eyerman, Ron; Jamison, Andrew (1998). Music and Social Movements: Mobilizing Traditions in the Twentieth Century. New York: Cambridge University Press. ISBN 978-0-521-62966-9.
- Seeger, Pete (1955). Talking Union and other Union Songs (liner notes). The Almanac Singers. Washington DC: Folkways Records. ASIN B000OV0WSU.
- Singer, Alan (1997). "Using Songs to Teach Labor History". OAH Magazine of History. 11 (2): 13–16. doi:10.1093/maghis/11.2.13. JSTOR 25163131.
- Winkler, Allan M. (2009). 'To Everything There is a Season' : Pete Seeger and the Power of Song: Pete Seeger and the Power of Song. New York: Oxford University Press. ISBN 978-0-19-971725-5.
