= Sod Buster Ballads =

Studio album by Almanac Singers
- Released: 1941
- Genre: Folk
- Label: General
- Producer: Alan Lomax

Almanac Singers chronology
Deep Sea Chanteys and Whaling Ballads (1941)	Sod Buster Ballads (1941)	Songs of the Lincoln Battalion (1942)

Sod Buster Ballads is a 1941 album by the Almanac Singers: Woody Guthrie, Millard Lampell, Lee Hays and Pete Seeger.

== Track listing ==
Sod Buster Ballads track listing
Track	Song Title	By
1.	The Dodger Song	Traditional
2.	Ground Hog	Traditional
3.	Hard, Ain't It Hard	Woody Guthrie
4.	House of the Rising Sun	Traditional
5.	I Ride an Old Paint	Traditional
6.	State of Arkansas	Traditional
