= The Complete Recordings =

The Complete Recordings can refer to several albums:

- The Complete Recordings (Oh-OK album)
- The Complete Recordings (Robert Johnson album)
- Complete Recordings (Black Tambourine album)

As well as:

- The Classic Quartet – Complete Impulse! Studio Recordings
- The Columbia Years 1943–1952: The Complete Recordings
- The Complete 1957 Riverside Recordings
- The Complete Blue Note and Roost Recordings
- The Complete Columbia Recordings of Miles Davis with John Coltrane
- Complete First National Band Recordings
- The Complete MCA Studio Recordings
- The Complete Reprise Studio Recordings
- The Complete Solid State Recordings of the Thad Jones/Mel Lewis Orchestra
- The Complete Studio Recordings (ABBA album)
- The Complete Studio Recordings (The Doors album)
- The Complete Studio Recordings (Led Zeppelin album)
- The Complete Village Vanguard Recordings, 1961
- The Complete Wooden Nickel Recordings
- Fillmore West 1969: The Complete Recordings
- The Heavyweight Champion: The Complete Atlantic Recordings
- Jelly Roll Morton: The Complete Library of Congress Recordings
- Message in a Box: The Complete Recordings
- Naked City: The Complete Studio Recordings
- New York Journeyman – Complete Recordings
- Their Complete General Recordings
- Winterland 1973: The Complete Recordings

== See also ==
- The Complete Studio Recordings (disambiguation)
