= Songs for John Doe =

Studio album by The Almanac Singers
- Released: May 1941
- Recorded: A Central Park West studio, New York City, Late March or early April 1941
- Genre: Folk
- Label: Almanac Records
- Producer: Erin Barnay

The Almanac Singers chronology
Songs for John Doe (1941)	Talking Union (1941)

Songs for John Doe is the 1941 debut album and first released product of The Almanac Singers, an influential early folk music group.

The album was released in May 1941, at a time when World War II was raging but the United States remained neutral. The Soviet Union and Nazi Germany were still at peace, as provided by the Molotov–Ribbentrop Pact. American Communists and "fellow travelers", including the Almanacs, followed the anti-interventionist stance dictated by the Soviet Union through the Comintern, which accounts for the appearance of anti-war songs on the album. However, on June 22, Germany invaded the Soviet Union. The Almanacs changed direction and began agitating for U.S. intervention in Europe. Songs for John Doe was quickly pulled from distribution, and those who had already purchased copies were asked to return them. After the Japanese attacks on Pearl Harbor, in February 1942 the Almanacs went into the studio to record a set of songs supporting the American war effort. The new political line was evident on the group's 1942 album, Dear Mr. President.

The opening song "Ballad of October 16" uses the melody of the folk song "Jesse James".

For the album, six masters were recorded in a two- or three-hour session. "'C' For Conscription" and "Washington Breakdown" were recorded as a single take.

== Track listing ==
Songs for John Doe track listing
Track	Song Title	By
1.	Ballad of October 16	Millard Lampell
2.	Billy Boy	Millard Lampell
3.	'C' For Conscription	Millard Lampell and Pete Seeger
4.	Liza Jane	Millard Lampell and Pete Seeger
5.	Plow Under	Millard Lampell and Pete Seeger
6.	The Strange Death of John Doe	Millard Lampell
7.	Washington Breakdown	Pete Seeger and Lee Hays

== Personnel ==
- Pete Seeger, vocal, banjo
- Lee Hays, vocal
- Millard Lampell, vocal
- Josh White, vocal, guitar
- Sam Gary, vocal
