= Deep Sea Chanteys and Whaling Ballads =

Studio album by Almanac Singers
- Released: 1941
- Recorded: July 7, 1941
- Genre: Folk
- Label: General
- Producer: Alan Lomax

Almanac Singers chronology
Talking Union (1941)	Deep Sea Chanteys and Whaling Ballads (1941)	Sod Buster Ballads (1942)

Deep Sea Chanteys and Whaling Ballads are two albums recorded then combined for release as a 1941 album by the Almanac Singers. The lineup of the group at the time was Millard Lampell, Lee Hays, Woody Guthrie and Pete Seeger. The group received a $250 advance for both albums and bought a Buick for a cross-country tour.

== Track listing ==
Deep Sea Chanteys and Whaling Ballads track listing
Track	Song Title	By
1.	"Blow the Man Down"	Traditional
2.	"Blow Ye Winds, Heigh Ho"	Traditional
3.	"The Coast of High Barbary"	Traditional
4.	"The Golden Vanity"	Traditional
5.	"Haul Away, Joe"	Traditional
6.	"Way, Rio"	Traditional
