= Their Complete General Recordings =

The Almanac Singers: Their Complete General Recordings

Compilation album by Almanac Singers
- Released: 1996
- Recorded: July 7, 1941
- Genre: Folk
- Label: MCA (1996 reissue)
- Producer: Alan Lomax (original); reissue produced by Andy McKaie

Their Complete General Recordings is a 1996 album of 1941 recordings by the Almanac Singers.

== Reception ==
Professional ratings
Review scores
Source	Rating
Allmusic	4.5/5 stars

Bruce Eder, writing for Allmusic wrote of the compilation "there isn't a bad song here" but about the liner notes commented "The notes are the only flaw, presenting an oversimplified history of the Almanacs that is a bit vague on details."

== Track listing ==
Track	Song Title	Lead Vocals
1.	Blow Ye Winds Heigh Ho	Pete Seeger
2.	Away, Rio	Pete Hawes
3.	Blow The Man Down	Woody Guthrie
4.	House of the Rising Sun	Woody Guthrie
5.	Ground Hog	Pete Seeger
6.	State of Arkansas	Lee Hays
7.	The Weaver's Song	Ensemble
8.	I Ride An Old Paint	Woody Guthrie
9.	Hard, Ain't It Hard	Woody Guthrie
10.	The Dodger Song	Lee Hays
11.	Greenland Fishing	Pete Seeger
12.	The Golden Vanity	Pete Seeger
13.	The Coast of High Barbary	Pete Seeger
14.	Haul Away, Joe	Pete Hawes

== Personnel ==
- Woody Guthrie – guitar, harmonica, vocal
- Pete Hawes – vocal, possibly guitar
- Lee Hays – vocal
- Millard Lampell – vocal
- Pete Seeger as Pete Bowers – banjo, recorder, vocal
