= Dean Gitter =

American businessman (1935–2018)

- Born: September 21, 1935
- Died: November 21, 2018 (aged 83); Taos County, New Mexico, U.S.
- Education: Phillips Academy; Harvard College (B.A.); London Academy of Music and Dramatic Art; Harvard Business School (M.B.A.)

Dean L. Gitter (September 21, 1935 – November 21, 2018) was an entrepreneur, musician, and real estate developer in the Catskills in New York.

== Biography ==
Gitter was a graduate of Phillips Academy, Harvard College, the London Academy of Music and Dramatic Art, and the Harvard Business School.

In the 1950s, Gitter produced recordings for Riverside Records, notably Odetta's debut album, Odetta Sings Ballads and Blues. Under the pseudonym of Dean Laurence, he produced Sam Gary's only album for the Esquire (UK) and Transition (US) labels. In 1958, Gitter recorded a folk album titled Ghost Ballads, released by Riverside Records.

In 1969, Gitter's University Cinema Association opened the Orson Welles Cinema in Cambridge, Massachusetts. Other business ventures included starting a Kingston-based regional TV station (WTZA), co-founding the Big Indian Spring Water Company, and running Catskill Corners, including the Emerson in Mount Tremper, New York. The Emerson is a member of the Small Luxury Hotels of the World, and Country Store at the Emerson features the world's largest kaleidoscope.

Gitter was the Managing Partner of Crossroads Ventures, LLC, a venture capital company located in Shandaken, New York. He later taught meditation in Big Indian, New York, where his spiritual teacher was Albert Rudolph. In 2013, he released the album "Carl Sandburg's American Songbag 2.0". In 2016, Gitter retired from the company and relocated to Taos County in Northern New Mexico, where he owned a farm, raised horses, and recorded music.

In 2014, Gitter released Old Folkies Never Die, his first studio album of original material since Ghost Ballads, making it the all-time longest gap between two consecutive studio albums at 57 years.

On November 21, 2018, Gitter died at the age of 83.
