= Harry Lime =

Harry Lime may refer to

- Harry Lime, a character in the 1949 film The Third Man
- The Adventures of Harry Lime, UK radio programme broadcast between 1951 and 1952 based on the character in the above film
- Harry Lime, a character in the 1990 film Home Alone

== See also ==
- Harry Lim (1919–1990), Javanese-American jazz producer
