= Talking Union (album) =

Studio album by Almanac Singers
- Released: 1941
- Genre: Folk
- Labels: Keynote 1941 Release, Folkways Records 1955
- Producer: Eric Bernay

Almanac Singers chronology
Songs for John Doe (1941)	Talking Union (1941)	Deep Sea Chanteys and Whaling Ballads (1941)

Professional ratings
Review scores
Source	Rating
AllMusic	4/5 stars

Talking Union is a 1941 album by the Almanac Singers. It is a collection of union songs and ballads, written by many different labor songwriters over the years. The liner notes include an introduction by Pete Seeger and song explanations by Philip Foner. In 2010, it was selected by the Library of Congress as an addition to the National Recording Registry, which selects recordings annually that are "culturally, historically, or aesthetically significant".

In 1955, the album was rereleased on Folkways Records as The Original Talking Union & Other Union Songs, expanded with seven songs recorded in 1955 by Pete Seeger and a chorus dubbed "the Song Swappers" that included Erik Darling, later of The Weavers, and Mary Travers, later of Peter, Paul and Mary.

== Track listing ==
Talking Union track listing
No.	Title	Writer(s)	Length
1.	"All I Want"	Words: Jim Garland, Tune: traditional	3:00
2.	"Get Thee Behind Me, Satan"	Almanac Singers	2:36
3.	"Talking Union"	Almanac Singers	2:59
4.	"Union Maid"	Words: Woody Guthrie, Tune: Kerry Mills	2:12
5.	"Union Train"	Traditional	2:20
6.	"Which Side Are You On"	Words: Florence Reece, Tune: traditional	2:11

1955 reissue track listing
No.	Title	Writer(s)	Performer(s)	Length
1.	"We Shall Not Be Moved"	Traditional	Pete Seeger and the Song Swappers	2:19
2.	"Roll the Union On"	Words: John Handcox, Tune: traditional	Pete Seeger and the Song Swappers	2:05
3.	"Casey Jones (The Union Scab)"	Words: Joe Hill, Tune: traditional	Pete Seeger and the Song Swappers	1:59
4.	"Miner's Lifeguard"	Words: traditional, Tune: Charles Davis Tillman	Pete Seeger and the Song Swappers	3:54
5.	"Solidarity Forever"	Words: Ralph Chaplin, Tune: traditional	Pete Seeger and the Song Swappers	2:55
6.	"You've Got to Go Down and Join the Union"	Words: Woody Guthrie, Tune: traditional	Pete Seeger and the Song Swappers	2:43
7.	"Hold the Fort"	Thomas W. "Old Beeswax" Taylor	Pete Seeger and the Song Swappers	2:26
8.	"Get Thee Behind Me, Satan"	Almanac Singers	Almanac Singers	2:36
9.	"Union Maid"	Words: Woody Guthrie, Tune: Kerry Mills	Almanac Singers	2:12
10.	"I Don't Want Your Millions, Mister (All I Want)"	Words: Jim Garland, Tune: traditional	Almanac Singers	3:00
11.	"Talking Union"	Almanac Singers	Almanac Singers	2:59
12.	"Union Train"	Traditional	Almanac Singers	2:20
13.	"Which Side Are You On"	Words: Florence Reece, Tune: traditional	Almanac Singers	2:11
