= Herbie Haymer =

American saxophonist

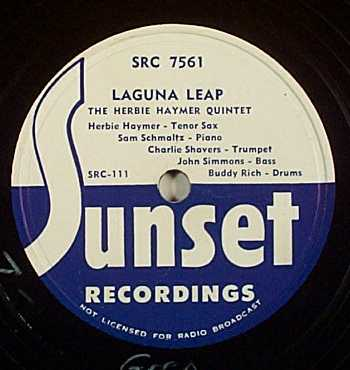
- Label of "Laguna Leap" by the Herbie Haymer Quintet

Background information
- Birth name: Herbert Maximillum “Herbie” Haymer
- Born: July 24, 1915; Jersey City, New Jersey, U.S.
- Died: April 11, 1949 (aged 33); Santa Monica, California, U.S.
- Genres: Jazz; Swing
- Occupation: Musician
- Instruments: Alto saxophone; Tenor saxophone
- Years active: 1932–1949

Herbert Haymer (July 24, 1915 – April 11, 1949) was an American jazz reedist, known primarily as a saxophonist in big bands.

== Life and career ==
Haymer was born in Jersey City, New Jersey, on July 24, 1915. He played alto saxophone from age 15 and picked up tenor at age 20.

He played with the Carl Sears-Johnny Watson Band, then played with Rudy Vallee, Charlie Barnet, Red Norvo (1935–1937), Jimmy Dorsey (1937–1941), Woody Herman (1941–1942), Kay Kyser (1942–1943), Benny Goodman, and Dave Hudkins. In 1944, he enlisted in the Navy, and after returning he worked as a session musician, including dates with Red Nichols and Goodman. In 1945, he led a quintet featuring Charlie Shavers and Nat King Cole on recording, and had three songs issued on Keynote Records in 1946. In 1949 he recorded with Frank Sinatra and was killed in an automobile accident after a session; he died in Santa Monica, California, on April 11 1949.
