= Arthur Adams (spy) =

Soviet spy

Arthur Aleksandrovich Adams (October 25, 1885, Eskilstuna, Sweden – January 14, 1969) was a Soviet spy, and Hero of the Russian Federation, who passed critical information to the Soviet Union about the American Manhattan Project.

== Early life ==
Adams was born in the city of Eskilstuna, Sweden, in 1885 to a Swedish father and a Russian Jewish mother. Following the death of his father, Adams's mother with her children returned to Russia, where she died in 1895. Adams entered a military navy school in 1896. In 1903 he graduated from a school of mining technology in Kronshtadt. His wife, Dorothy, was an aunt of American book editor Robert Gottlieb.

== Political activities and exile ==
While in college, Adams joined the Bolshevik party and actively participated in the 1905 Russian Revolution in Russia's South. The Tsarist police arrested him and sent him into exile in 1905, Adams escaped from his place of exile and emigrated to the United States in 1913. His Russian biographers claim he served in the United States army during World War I and eventually achieved the rank of major.

In 1919 Adams was included in the Martens' mission (a de facto Soviet trade mission in the United States).

An acute lack of qualified personnel (a situation partially created by the Bolsheviks themselves) meant that Adams, with his strong engineering background, immediately became a top bureaucrat.

In 1925 Adams became deputy head of the Main Board of Aviation Industry of the USSR, and worked in that position for 10 years. Adams was responsible for supplies of imported equipment and materials for the aviation industry and therefore often made trips abroad. That's when he was noticed by experts of surveillance agency of Red Army (future GRU).

Adams, an educated engineer, established personal relationships with other scientists during his frequent trips abroad. He often visited enterprises in Europe and America. Adams collected technical and industrial information which he shared with the Soviet military. As Adams was successful in completing tasks of the surveillance agency, it was decided to accept him as staff intelligence worker. In 1935, at the age of 50, Adams was enlisted to serve in the chief intelligence service of the Red Army.

Adams was sent to the U.S. for illegal work. He quickly managed to get a legal position, and established his own firm and his own agent network involving over 20 experts from the American military industrial enterprises.

In 1938 Adams was summoned to Moscow, having been falsely denounced. The falsified case against Adams was closed and in 1939 he moved back to the U.S., creating his intelligence network anew.

== Atomic espionage ==
Arthur Adams was one of the first Soviet spies to receive information about the American Manhattan Project. Contemporary Russian sources state that Adams (codename: Achilles) was in contact with an agent (codename: Eskulap) who was associated with the Chicago Met Lab. In June 1944 Eskulap reportedly gave Adams 2500 pages of documents relating to the development of the atomic bomb. In July and August he provided another 1500 pages and specimens of weapon-grade uranium, plutonium, and beryllium, Eskulap did not appear at the September rendezvous and Adams learned he was terminally ill. The existence of the covernames Eskulap and Achilles is proven by their appearance in a single Venona decrypt dated August 1943. However, the only information that can be gleaned from this message is that Eskulap's wife worked for "Chicago University". The identity and occupation of Eskulap, as well as his association with Adams, if any, remains unknown, although the use of the covername "Eskulap" ("Asclepius"), suggests he may have been a doctor of medicine.

It is known that, in 1943, U.S. Military Intelligence received information from confidential sources linking Adams to scientists working at the Met Lab. In the spring of 1944 they observed clandestine meetings between Adams and Met Lab scientist Clarence Hiskey. The FBI and Military Security performed an illegal search of Adam's New York apartment and discovered sophisticated camera equipment, material for constructing microfilm, and notes on experiments being conducted at the atomic bomb laboratory in Oak Ridge, Tennessee. They also observed him climbing into an automobile driven by Pavel Mikhailov (codename: Molière) the GRU station chief in New York. The U.S. military decided to neutralize Hiskey by drafting him into the army in April 1944. Before reporting for duty Hiskey introduced Adams to two other prospective sources, John Hitchcock Chapin and Edward Manning, both of whom would later deny, before congressional committees, passing secret information to Adams. The military assigned Hiskey to an outpost near the Arctic Circle where he held a job counting winter underwear. While en route, Hiskey's bags were searched and found to contain seven pages of notes on secret work at Oak Ridge. There are a number of Venona decrypts which refer to Hiskey, (codename: Ramsey) but they are concerned with Soviet attempts to re-establish contact with him once he had been drafted. Hiskey may originally have had the codename Eskulap. His wife also had a communist background.

Another Adams operation to penetrate the Manhattan Project occurred in the winter of 1944. A counterintelligence officer caught one of Adams' agents, Irving Lerner, an employee of the Motion Picture Division of the United States Office of War Information, attempting to photograph the cyclotron at the University of California, Berkeley Radiation Laboratory. The cyclotron had been used in the creation of plutonium and Lerner was acting without authorization. Lerner resigned his job and went to work for Keynote Records in New York, a jazz label which also employed Adams as a technician.

Early in 1945 Adams eluded FBI surveillance while taking his dog for a walk. The FBI picked up his trail in Chicago where he was seen boarding a train for the west coast accompanied by Eric Bernay, owner of Keynote Records and a well-known Comintern agent. The FBI prevented Adams from boarding a waiting Soviet vessel in Portland, Oregon, but were under orders not to arrest him in order to avoid a diplomatic incident. Adams returned to New York and escaped to the Soviet Union in 1946.

After retirement from the GRU in 1948, Adams worked for a long time as political observer at TASS. He died in 1969 and is buried at Moscow's Novodevichy Cemetery.

On June 17, 1999, Russian president Boris Yeltsin posthumously awarded him the title Hero of the Russian Federation "for courage and heroism shown during the performance of special assignments".

== Public exposure ==
Information about Adams started to come to light about a year after his defection.

In 1947, Isaac Don Levine mentioned Adams in the anti-communist magazine Plain Talk:

The missing figure of Stalin's ace agent in the atomic spy ring, usually described as "going under the name of Arthur Adams," can now be identified, believe it or not, as a Canadian whose real name is Arthur Adams.

In 1952, Whittaker Chambers mentions Adams in a footnote in his memoirs (and Chambers had known Levine at least since his defection in 1938, as Levine had introduced Chambers to fellow defected Soviet spy Walter Krivitsky):

I did not know that there existed a sealed indictment of the Soviet agent, Arthur Adams. This fact, I am told, has never before been published. I am also informed that it was the intervention of the State Department that prevented the justice Department from prosecuting that case.

== See also ==
- Atomic spies
- List of Heroes of the Russian Federation
- Nuclear espionage
- Soviet espionage in the United States

== External sources ==
- Venona 1276 GRU New York to Moscow, 2 August 1943
- "The Atomic Spy Hunt". Time. October 4, 1948. Archived from the original on February 1, 2011.
- Arthur Aleksandrovich Adams, WarHeroes.Ru (in Russian)
- US House of Representatives, 80th Congress, Special Session, Committee on Un-American Activities, Report on Soviet Espionage Activities in Connection with the Atom Bomb, September 28, 1948 (US Gov. Printing Office).
- Testimony of James Sterling Murray and Edward Tiers Manning, 14 August and 5 October 1949, U.S. Congress, House of Representatives, Committee on Un-American Activities, 81st Cong., 1st sess., 877–899.
- The Shameful Years: Thirty Years of Soviet Espionage in the United States, U.S. Congress, House of Representatives, Committee on Un-American Activities, 30 December 1951.
- John Earl Haynes and Harvey Klehr, Venona: Decoding Soviet Espionage in America, Yale University Press (1999).
