= Keynote Records =

- Founded: 1940
- Country of origin: United States

Keynote Records was a record label founded by record store owner Eric Bernay in 1940. The label's initial releases were folk and protest songs from the Soviet Union and the Spanish Civil War, and several anti-war releases from American musicians followed. From 1943, the label released recordings in the jazz idiom produced by Harry Lim. The music critic John S. Wilson in 1965 described the company's jazz output as "an unusually valid reflection of the jazz spirits of the times." An unwise investment in a factory to manufacture records in 1947 led to the company becoming bankrupt in 1948, and came under the control of Mercury Records.

During WWII, Keynote employed two Soviet spies: Irving Lerner and Arthur Adams (spy). Early in 1945, Bernay helped Adams elude FBI surveillance while taking his dog for a walk. The FBI picked up his trail in Chicago where he was seen boarding a train for the west coast accompanied by Bernay, a well-known Comintern agent.

The Keynote jazz sessions were comprehensively reissued in 1986 when Nippon Phonogram/PolyGram released a 21 LP set with 115 previously unissued takes. Robert Palmer in The New York Times in October 1986 described it as "a much more substantial addition to the treasury of absolutely essential classic jazz performances than one could have expected or hoped for this late in the game." In 2013, a 11-CD set of Keynote jazz recordings was issued by the Spanish Fresh Sound label. Donald Clarke, writing about Lim's for Keynote, described him as knowing what he was doing and getting "good sound, with no gimmicks."

== Roster ==
- The Almanac Singers
- George Barnes
- Count Basie
- Barney Bigard
- Marc Blitzstein
- Pete Brown
- Cozy Cole
- Corky Corcoran
- Irving Fazola
- Roy Eldridge
- Bud Freeman
- Paul Gonsalves
- Johnny Guarnieri
- Bill Harris
- George Hartman
- Ann Hathaway
- Coleman Hawkins
- Herbie Haymer
- J.C. Heard
- Neal Hefti
- Earl Hines
- Milt Hinton
- Danny Hurd
- Clyde Hurley
- Chubby Jackson
- Jonah Jones
- Kansas City Seven
- The Keynoters
- Mannie Klein
- Bernie Leighton
- Al Menconi
- Benny Morton
- Ted Nash
- Red Norvo
- Paul Robeson
- Earl Robinson
- Red Rodney
- Harold Rome
- Arnold Ross
- Babe Russin
- Gene Sedric
- Charlie Shavers
- Willie Smith
- Rex Stewart
- Billy Taylor
- Joe Thomas
- Juan Tizol
- Lennie Tristano
- Dinah Washington
- George Wettling
- Josh White
- Lester Young
