= Hilda Charlton =

American spiritual teacher

- Born: 1906; London, England
- Died: January 29, 1988 (aged 81–82); New York City, NY, USA
- Occupations: Dancer, spiritual teacher

Hilda Charlton (1906 – January 29, 1988) was a spiritual teacher, author, dancer, and healer who taught classes in meditation and prayer in New York City for 23 years.

== Biography ==
Hilda was born in London, United Kingdom, in 1906, and moved to the United States with her parents when she was 4 years old. She was raised in Salt Lake City and Los Angeles. At the age of 18, she began performing as a modern dancer. For the next 20 years, she danced and taught in the San Francisco area.

From 1947 to 1950 Hilda toured India as a dancer and stayed in the country for fifteen more years, studying eastern mysticism and meditation. She was guided by great spiritual masters and holy people, including Nityananda of Ganeshpuri, Sri Mahadevanansa of Bombay, and Sai Baba of Puttaparthi.

Hilda settled in New York City upon returning to America. She became a spiritual teacher at the request of people she met, and over the years her classes grew in size from two people to more than a thousand. The location was moved from a student's apartment to the basement of St. Luke's Church. In 1976, the location was moved to the nave and later to the Synod House of the Cathedral of St. John the Divine. She was one of the founding members of the Hindu Temple Society of North America, the first traditional Hindu temple in North America.

Her teachings incorporated the fundamental principles of the world's religions. Foremost in her classes, she stressed the importance of a life of giving and forgiving, unconditional love, and remembrance of God. Hilda's lectures included poignant stories of her life, practical lessons for everyday living, guidance in prayer, and meditation. Her style combined humor, practicality, and deep insight into the human mind and spirit.

Her teachings had a profound effect on the lives of thousands of people from all walks of life. Alcoholics and drug addicts were known to conquer their addictions, prostitutes left the street, and those afflicted with serious diseases often reported experiencing remission and cure. She took no personal credit for these miracles, giving all credit to God.

She died in New York City on January 29, 1988.

Hilda taught and shared with many spiritual teachers including Ram Dass in the 70's, Sivaya Subramuniyaswami and Albert Rudolph (Rudi).

== Books ==
- Saints Alive, by Hilda Charlton (ISBN 0927383-00-4)
- The New Sun, by Hilda Charlton (ISBN 0927383-01-2)
- Master Hilarion, by Hilda Charlton (ISBN 0927383-02-0)
- Skanda, by Hilda Charlton (ISBN 0927383-03-9)
- Divine Mother Speaks, by Hilda Charlton (ISBN 0927383-18-7)
- Pioneers Of The Soul, by Hilda Charlton (ISBN 0927383-12-8)
- Hell Bent For Heaven, by Hilda Charlton (ISBN 0927383-15-2)
