= Big Indian, New York =

Coordinates: 42°06′10″N 74°26′35″W

- Hamlet
- Location within the state of New York
- Country: United States
- State: New York
- Region: Catskills
- County: Ulster
- Town: Shandaken
- Time zone: UTC-5 (Eastern (EST))
  - Summer (DST): UTC-4 (EDT)
- ZIP code: 12410
- Area code: 845

Big Indian is a hamlet within the Town of Shandaken in Ulster County, New York, United States. It is located along State Route 28, within the Catskill Park, 17 miles (27 km) west of Woodstock. The Esopus Creek flows through the area, as Birch Creek feeds in from the north. Big Indian Hollow is located slightly to the west, while Big Indian Mountain sits to the southwest.

== Origin of name ==
Once a Munsee Native American man named Winneesook (the name means "snowfall") lived near Marbletown, New York; because of his height of about seven feet, he was also called Big Indian. He was in love with a local woman, Gertrude Molyneux, who eventually loved him as well; because her parents opposed the match, they arranged a marriage with one Joseph Bundy. Disliking Bundy, Gertrude eloped with Winneesook into the wilderness. Some years later, a party of people searching for a missing cow was led by Bundy; still seeking revenge, he accused "that big Indian" of stealing the cow. When they finally found Winneesook, Bundy shot him with his rifle and injured him severely; after being left alone, Winneesook crawled to a pine tree where Gertrude found him later, dying. After Winneesook's death and burial, Gertrude and her children moved to the site; the hamlet of Big Indian later developed at that location. Local lore holds that the pine tree stood until the railroad through Big Indian was built in the 1880s.

== Climate ==
This climatic region is typified by large seasonal temperature differences, with warm to hot (and often humid) summers and cold (sometimes severely cold) winters. According to the Köppen Climate Classification system, Big Indian has a humid continental climate, abbreviated "Dfb" on climate maps.

== Notable people ==
- Alexander Chee, author
- Lhasa de Sela, singer
- Dean Gitter, entrepreneur
- Albert Rudolph, spiritual teacher
