= The Sinking of the Reuben James =

Song by Almanac Singers
- Written: 1941–1942
- Published: 1942
- Composer: music from "Wildwood Flower" by Joseph Philbrick Webster
- Lyricist: Woody Guthrie

"The Sinking of the Reuben James" is a song by Woody Guthrie about the sinking of the U.S. convoy escort USS Reuben James, which was the first U.S. naval ship sunk by German U-boats in World War II. Woody Guthrie had started to write a song including each name on the casualty list of the sinking. This was later replaced by the chorus "tell me what were their names."

The song is set to the melody of "Wildwood Flower", an antebellum tune by Joseph Philbrick Webster.

== Recordings ==
- The Almanac Singers on Dear Mr. President 1942
- Johnny Horton on Johnny Horton Sings History 1960
- Oscar Brand on Every Inch a Sailor 1960
- Kingston Trio on Close-Up 1961
- The Chad Mitchell Trio on Reflecting 1963
- The Highwaymen on Homecoming 1963
- Pete Seeger on Waist Deep in the Big Muddy and Other Love Songs 1967
- Country Joe McDonald on Thinking of Woody Guthrie 1969
