= Rudi (spiritual teacher) =

American spiritual teacher (1928–1973)

- Born: Albert Rudolph; January 24, 1928; Brooklyn, New York, US
- Died: February 21, 1973 (aged 45); Catskill Mountains
- Other name: Swami Rudrananda
- Occupations: spiritual teacher, antiquary
- Known for: kundalini yoga teaching
- Website: https://rudimovie.org, http://www.rudi.org

Albert Rudolph (January 24, 1928 – February 21, 1973), known as Rudi or Swami Rudrananda, was a spiritual teacher and an antiquities entrepreneur in New York City.

== Life and career ==
=== Early years ===
Albert Rudolph was born January 24, 1928, to impoverished Jewish parents in Brooklyn, New York. His father abandoned the family when he was young.

According to his autobiography, Rudolph's first spiritual experience occurred at age 6 in a park. Two Tibetan Buddhist lamas appeared out of the air and stood before him. They told him they represented the heads of the "Red Hat" and "Yellow Hat" sects, and they were going to place within him the energy and wisdom of Tibetan Buddhism. Several clay jars appeared, which they said they would put inside his solar plexus. The lamas said these jars would stay in him and begin to open at age 31. He would then begin the process of assimilating their contents, and would continue to do so for the rest of his life.

Rudolph began his first job at age 12 in a handbag factory, due to a labor shortage during World War II. To supplement his income, he searched through neighborhood rubbish bins to find items to sell. His next job was at a textile company when he was 16 years old, where he worked for the next two years.

Rudolph joined the U.S. Army at age 18. For 1½ years, he was an instructor for the government, teaching ROTC at the University of Washington in Seattle. After being discharged, he returned to his job at the textile company in New York.

=== Middle years ===
At age 20, Rudolph – now calling himself "Rudi" – "experienced a deep spiritual awakening". He also developed a serious interest in Asian art and began collecting sculpture.

Due to downsizing at the textile company, Rudi's employer helped him to enter North Carolina State College, where he studied textile engineering. After college, Rudi returned to New York, where he became an engineering trainee at a textile company. During this time, Rudi began to attend meetings based on the teachings of Gurdjieff, which he continued for 5 years.

Rudi wrote that when walking in Greenwich Village, he saw a storefront with a "FOR RENT" sign in the window. It was small and in terrible condition. He reported that he heard a voice whisper, "This is your store, this is your store, this is your store." He soon opened "Rudi Oriental Arts" in the Seventh Avenue space, with just a few hundred dollars and some of the sculptures he had collected. Early on, Rudi supplemented his income by working evenings at the Village Vanguard nearby. In the next years, Rudi established an international network of Asian art suppliers, collectors, and distributors in several countries.

Rudi joined the Subud organization, studying with its founder, Pak Subuh, and helping to establish the group in New York. In 1958, Rudi met Swami Bharati Krishna Tirtha, Shankaracharya of Puri, during his first visit to the United States, and lived with him in New York for 4 months.

At age 30, Rudi was at a turning point in his life when a friend took him to meet Bhagavan Nityananda at his ashram in Ganeshpuri, Maharashtra. Rudi later wrote, "My first meeting, in India in 1958, with the great Indian saint Bhagavan Nityananda was of such depth that it changed the course of my life." Rudi continued to study with Nityananda, whom he considered his ultimate guru, until his master died in 1961.

In early 1959, Rudi declared himself a spiritual teacher and began teaching students individually in his store. Rudi's method was to sit opposite a student and gaze intently into their eyes for perhaps five to ten minutes, said to allow him to transmit shaktipat energy.

In 1960, Rudi began to hold classes in his apartment, which consisted of an open-eyed meditation where he "transmitted shaktipat energy" in a group setting, followed by a lecture. Spiritual teacher and friend Hilda Charlton was frequently in attendance. Occasionally after classes, Rudi would invite the students up to his living room to play poker, or he would take them to dinner in Chinatown.

In early 1961, Rudi sat for a painting by Edith Montlack, an artist in New Rochelle, New York.

In 1961, Rudi first met Swami Venkatesananda in India, and they became lifelong friends.

In 1962, after Bhagawan Nityananda's death, Rudi became a student of Swami Muktananda in India, mainly because of that adept's strong shaktipat powers and discipleship to Nityananda, according to several sources. In 1966, Rudi traveled to Ganeshpuri with the intention of obtaining the title of 'swami' from Muktananda. Muktananda did not want to give Rudi the title, and so Rudi spoke with Chakrapani Ullal, a Vedic astrologer, about the situation. Chakrapani Ullal agreed with Rudi and persuaded Muktananda to give him the title, 'Swami Rudrananda', thereby initiating him into the Sarasvati branch of the Dashanami Sampradaya, established by Shankara in the 8th century. (Note: Thursby: "A total of about six dozen men and women of various nationalities were initiated as monks of the Saraswati order under the sponsorship of Swami Muktananda".)

In 1964, Franklin Jones, who later became the controversial guru Adi Da, became a student. For two years, Rudi's influence on Jones was pervasive. Jones eventually traveled to India to meet Swami Muktananda, who encouraged Jones to abandon his studies with Rudi and study with himself directly, which Jones did. Later, Jones severed all contact with Rudi, though they spoke again years later.

By 1967, Rudi's business had expanded. He traveled to Asia at least two or three times per year. In 1968, Rudi moved his store, Rudi Oriental Antiques. The new location was five times larger, and in attendance at the gala opening was Japanese Zen master Eido Tai Shimano.

That autumn, Rudi began searching for a location to establish an ashram. After a few months, he discovered a small Borscht Belt resort in the town of Big Indian, New York. Rudi purchased and named it Shree Gurudev Rudrananda Yoga Ashram. He traveled there on weekends, giving classes and supervising the restoration of the property by his students.

Rudi was said to be an excellent chef. He enjoyed the performing arts and music, movies, television, and mystery novels.

In 1970, Rudi arranged for Muktananda to visit the United States for the first time. Muktananda arrived with his entourage on Labor Day weekend in New York, and traveled with Rudi to Big Indian to stay for two months. Ram Dass was also present. Late in October Rudi escorted Muktananda on tour to Texas and California.

In 1971, after what he felt was abusive behaviour from his guru (such as taking Rudi's students, criticizing his teaching methods, asking him to sever his inner connection to Nityananda) Rudi dissolved his affiliation with Muktananda.

=== Later years ===
In September 1972, Rudi traveled to India with four of his students. While in India, they visited Swami Chidananda at the Divine Life Society in Rishikesh.

By end of 1972, Rudi had established fourteen ashrams in the US, and three in Europe. His Manhattan store housed one of the largest Asian art collections in the world.

In early 1973, Rudi published Spiritual Cannibalism, his only book.

On February 21, 1973, Rudi died in a small plane crash in the Catskills. The three other occupants walked away with only minor injuries. He was dictating a journal entry, and his last words were, "...a deeper sense of surrender".

== Teachings ==
Rudi taught an eclectic blend of techniques he called "Kundalini yoga" (though with no formal relation to the Indian tradition by that name). He wrote it was "a yoga which is used to collect energy within yourself and bring through your own chemistry the energy that is in the universe. A human being is only able to do that by internalizing energy and bringing it through their system. A person has all the mysteries of the universe inside."

Rudi developed several spiritual exercises with physical components, which he describes in detail in his book Spiritual Cannibalism. They include exercises for releasing negative energy, cultivating gratitude, sitting with deceased persons, and "double breathing" for "drawing in cosmic energy".
