= Dear Mr. President (album) =

Studio album by Almanac Singers
- Released: 1942
- Genre: Folk
- Label: Keynote
- Producer: Alan Lomax

Almanac Singers chronology
Songs Of The Lincoln Battalion (1940)	Dear Mr. President (1942)

Dear Mr. President is a 1942 album by the Almanac Singers.

== History ==
After the Japanese attacks on Pearl Harbor, in February 1942 the Almanacs went into the studio to record a set of songs supporting the American war effort. This was partly because with American entrance into World War II all American unions adopted a no-strike pledge. Another contributing factor was that, after Hitler invaded the USSR in June 1941, Moscow had reversed its previous anti-intervention stance as expressed in the group's earlier album, Songs for John Doe. This lost the Almanacs a sizeable chunk of their working repertoire.

== Track listing ==
Dear Mr. President track listing
Track	Song Title	By
1.	Belt Line Girl	Agnes 'Sis' Cunningham
2.	Dear Mr. President	Pete Seeger
3.	Deliver the Goods	Seeger, Hawes
4.	Reuben James	Guthrie, Hays, Lampell
5.	Round and Round Hitler's Grave	Guthrie, Lampell, Seeger
6.	Side By Side	Arthur Stern

== Personnel ==
- Agnes Cunningham, vocals, accordion
- Baldwin "Butch" Hawes, vocals
- Bess Lomax Hawes, vocals, mandolin
- Arthur Stern, vocals
- Pete Seeger, vocals, banjo

Production notes:

- Earl Robinson – director
