= Harry Lim =

Javanese-American jazz producer

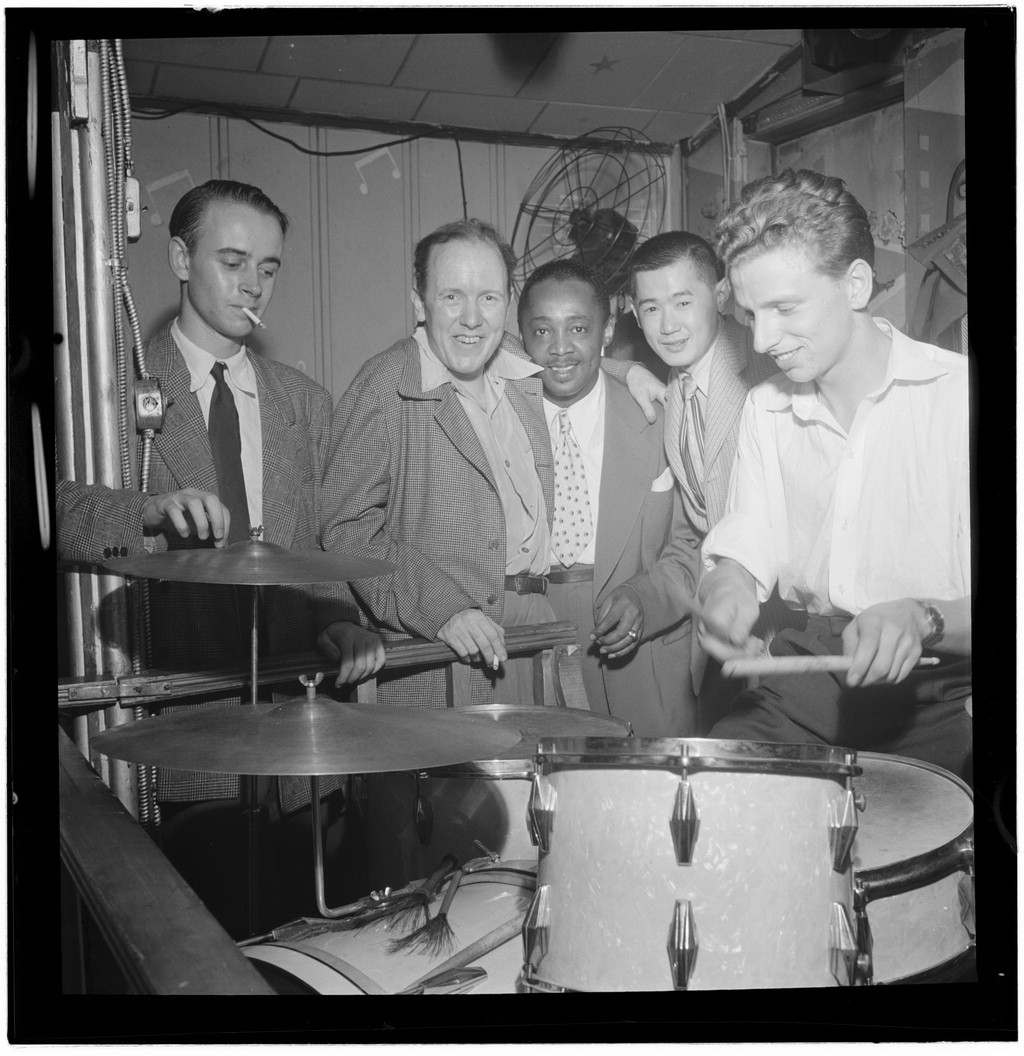
Portrait of Harry Lim (second from the right), with Yannich Bruynoche, and Joe Thomas, Pied Piper, New York, NY, 1946

Harry Lim (February 23, 1919 – July 26, 1990) was a Javanese-American jazz producer, best known for his work with Keynote Records.

== Early life and education ==
Harry Lim was born in Batavia, Java, now Jakarta, Indonesia. With a family heavily involved in the rubber industry, Lim had a good education and learned to speak English fluently. At age four, the family moved to Holland. He developed an interest in jazz as a young child and collected jazz records form age ten. At age 17, he moved back to Java. By 1938, he had a jazz radio show and had founded the Batavia Rhythm Club, which promoted jazz through films, lectures and discussions. For two years, he published the club's magazine, Swing: Officeel Orgaan van de Batavia Rhythm Club; he was responsible for the funding and most of the writing of the journal. In 1940, he visited New York City as a tourist, and began meeting jazz artists. Described as "friendly, sincere and outgoing," he was quickly accepted to the inner circle of the jazz world. He then spent seven months observing the jazz scene in New Orleans. While there, he did his first recordings, four George Hartman band sessions. When the war broke out he stayed in the United States, working as a jazz critic, promoter and running jam sessions at the new Village Vanguard. His absence as a promoter in Batavia was felt, and jazz activity declined during the war years.

== Keynote years ==
In late 1943, he approached Keynote Records president Eric Bernay, about becoming a jazz record producer. Keynote had previously been doing mainly left-wing folk and protest songs, and needed to expand its audience; Lim joined Keynote as a self-financing producer. His best known musicians of the era to feature on Keynote were Benny Carter, Coleman Hawkins and Lester Young. He gave many artists their first opportunity to record as leaders, including Young and Lennie Tristano. Many of the recordings were 12 inch 78s, which were unusual for the time, giving extra "blowing room." Keynote was in decline in 1947 and Lim left that year; it was taken over by Mercury Records in 1948 and Lim lost all the rights to the recordings he produced.

Most of the Keynote jazz sessions were effectively lost until 1986 when Nippon Phonogram/PolyGram issued a 21 LP set with 115 previously unissued takes. In 2013, there was a 11CD reissue of Keynote jazz recordings by the Spanish Fresh Sound label. Donald Clarke wrote of Lim's work at Keynote described him as knowing what he was doing and getting "good sound, with no gimmicks."

== Later years ==
Lim kept active in the jazz scene. In 1948, he started a short lived label, HL, which produced only a few obscure albums. He worked at Sam Goody as a jazz buyer 1956–1973. In 1972, he formed the Famous Door label, recording top mainstream jazz artists, such as Bill Watrous, Zoot Sims, Scott Hamilton and Red Norvo. While running Famous Door, Lim wrote his own liner notes and had his family assist in filling and shipping the orders to distributors. He observed that to be successful as a "little guy" in the record business required guts and hanging in when things are rough. He worked only with artists with whom he had a warm rapport and admired, and he kept an eye open for new talent. Famous Door was active until Lim died in 1990 when it folded. The label was sold to jazz preservationist George H. Buck. Lim was "happily still living when all of the Keynote jazz sessions" were reissued in a 21LP box-set in 1986."
