= The Almanac Singers =

1940s American folk music band

Almanac Singers
- Origin: New York City
- Genres: Folk, Industrial Folk
- Years active: 1940–1942/1943
- Labels: Keynote, Almanac, General, Asch, Stinson
- Spinoffs: The Weavers
- Past members: Woody Guthrie; Lee Hays; Millard Lampell; Pete Seeger; Sis Cunningham; Peter Hawes; Baldwin "Butch" Hawes; Bess Lomax Hawes; Cisco Houston; Arthur Stern; Josh White; Jackie Alper; Burl Ives; Jaime Lowden; Sam Gary; Charles Polacheck

The Almanac Singers was an American New York City-based folk music group, active between 1940 and 1943, founded by Millard Lampell, Lee Hays, and Pete Seeger, later joined by Woody Guthrie. The group specialized in topical songs, mostly songs advocating an anti-war, anti-racism and pro-union philosophy. They were part of the Popular Front, an alliance of liberals and leftists, including the Communist Party USA (whose slogan, under their leader Earl Browder, was "Communism is twentieth century Americanism"), who had vowed to put aside their differences in order to fight fascism and promote racial and religious inclusiveness and workers' rights. The Almanac Singers felt strongly that songs could help achieve these goals.

== History ==
Cultural historian Michael Denning writes, "The base of the Popular Front was labor movement, the organization of millions of industrial workers into the new unions of the CIO. For this was the age of the CIO, the years that one historian has called 'the largest sustained surge of worker organization in American history'". "By the early 1940s," he continues, "the CIO was dominated by new unions in the metalworking industries--the United Autoworkers, the United Steel Workers, and the United Electrical Workers--and 'industrial unionism' was not simply a kind of unionism but a kind of social reconstruction". It is in the context of this social movement that the story of the Almanac Singers, which formed in early 1941, ought to be seen.

In late 1940 and early 1941 (before America entered World War II) rearmament was putting an end to a decade of unemployment; and labor was at its most militant. As the CIO fought racial discrimination in hiring, it had to confront deep racial divides in its own membership, particularly in the UAW plants in Detroit where white workers sometimes struck to protest the promotion of black workers to production jobs. It also worked on this issue in shipyards in Alabama, mass transit in Philadelphia, and steel plants in Baltimore. The CIO leadership, particularly those in more left unions such as the Packinghouse Workers, the UAW, the NMU and the Transport Workers, undertook serious efforts to suppress hate strikes and to educate their membership. Those unions contrasted their relatively bold attack on the problem with the timidity and racism of the AFL.

Almanac members Millard Lampell, Lee Hays, Pete Seeger, and Woody Guthrie began playing together informally in 1940 or 1941. Pete Seeger and Guthrie had met at Will Geer's Grapes of Wrath Evening, a benefit for displaced migrant workers, in March 1940. That year, Seeger joined Guthrie on a trip to Texas and California to visit Guthrie's relatives. Hays and Lampell had rented a New York City apartment together in October 1940, and on his return Seeger moved in with them. They called their apartment Almanac House, and it became a center for leftist intellectuals as well as crash pad for folksingers, including (in 1942) Sonny Terry and Brownie McGhee.

Ed Cray says that Hays and Seeger's first paying gig was in January 1941 at a fund-raising benefit for Spanish Civil War Loyalists at the Jade Mountain restaurant in New York City. According to a 1965 interview with Lee Hays by Richard Reuss, Seeger, Hays, and Lampell sang at an American Youth Congress held at Turner's Arena in Washington, D.C., in February 1941, at which sponsors had requested songs constructed around the slogan "Don't Lend or Lease our Bases" and "Jim Crow must Go". Shortly after this, they decided to call themselves the Almanacs. They chose the name because Lee Hays had said that back home in Arkansas farmers had only two books in their houses: the Bible, to guide and prepare them for life in the next world, and the Almanac, to tell them about conditions in this one."

Performers who sang with the group at various times included Sis Cunningham, (John) Peter Hawes and his brother Baldwin "Butch" Hawes, Bess Lomax Hawes (wife of Butch and sister of Alan Lomax), Cisco Houston, Arthur Stern, Josh White, Jackie (Gibson) Alper, Burl Ives, (Hiram) Jaime Lowden and Sam Gary.

They invented a driving, energetic performing style, based on what they felt was the best of American country string band music, black and white. They wore street clothes, which was unheard of in an era when entertainers routinely wore formal, night-club attire, and they invited the audience to join in the singing. The Almanacs had many gigs playing at parties, rallies, benefits, unions meetings, and informal "hootenannies", a term Seeger and Guthrie learned on an Almanac tour of Portland and Washington.

On May day of 1941, they entertained a rally of 20,000 striking transit workers in Madison Square Garden, where they introduced the song "Talking Union" and participated in a dramatic sketch with the young actress Carol Channing.

== Recordings and Reds ==
The Almanacs' first record release, an album of three 78s called Songs for John Doe, written to protest the Selective Training and Service Act of 1940, the first peacetime draft in U.S. history. Recorded in February or March 1941 and issued in May, it comprised four songs written by Millard Lampell and two by Seeger and Hays (including "Plow Under") that followed the Communist Party line (after the 1939 Molotov–Ribbentrop Pact), urging non-intervention in World War II. It was produced by the founder of Keynote Records, Eric Bernay. Bernay, who owned a small record store, was the former business manager of the magazine New Masses, which in 1938 and 1939 had sponsored John H. Hammond's landmark From Spirituals to Swing Concert. Perhaps because of its controversial content, Songs for John Doe came out under the imprint "Almanac Records", and Bernay insisted that the performers themselves (in this case Pete Seeger, Millard Lampell, Josh White, and Sam Gary, an interracial group) pay for the costs of production. Songs for John Doe attacked big American corporations (such as J.P. Morgan and DuPont), repeating the Party's line that they had supported German rearmament, and during the period of re-armament in 1941, were now vying for government contracts to build up the defenses of the U.S. Besides being anti-union, these corporations were a focus of progressive and black activist anger because they barred blacks from employment in defense work.

The album also criticized President Roosevelt's unprecedented peacetime draft, insinuating that he was going to war for J.P. Morgan. Seeger later said that he believed the Communist argument at that time that the war was "phony" and that big business merely wanted to use Hitler as a proxy to attack Soviet Russia. Bess Lomax Hawes, who was twenty at the time and did not sing on the John Doe album, writes in her autobiography Sing It Pretty (2008), that for her part, she had taken the pacifist oath as a girl out of repugnance for what she thought was the senseless brutality of the First World War (a sentiment shared by many) and that she took the oath very seriously. However, she said that events were happening so fast, and such terrible news was coming out about German atrocities, that the Almanacs hardly knew what to believe from one day to the next, and they found themselves adjusting their topical repertoire on a daily basis.

Every day, it seemed, another once-stable European political reality would fall to the rapidly expanding Nazi armies, and the agonies of the death camps were beginning to reach our ears. The Almanacs, as self-defined commentators, were inevitably affected by the intense national debate between the "warmongers" and the "isolationists" (and the points between). Before every booking we had to decide: were we going to sing some of our hardest-hitting and most eloquent songs, all of which were antiwar, and if we weren't, what would we sing anyway? ... We hoped the next headline would not challenge our entire roster of poetic ideas. Woody Guthrie wrote a song that mournfully stated: "I started out to write a song to the entire population / But no sooner than I got the words down, here come a brand new situation".

On June 22, 1941, Hitler broke the non-aggression pact and attacked the Soviet Union, and Keynote promptly destroyed all its inventory of Songs for John Doe. The CIO now urged support for Roosevelt and the draft, and it forbade its members from participation in strikes for the duration (angering some in the movement).

On June 25, 1941, Roosevelt, under pressure from black leaders, who were threatening a massive march on Washington against segregation in the army and the exclusion of blacks from factories doing defense work, signed Executive Order 8802 (The Fair Employment Act) banning racial discrimination by corporations receiving federal defense contracts. The racial situation, which had threatened black support for the peacetime draft, was now somewhat defused (even though the Army still declined to desegregate) and the march was canceled.

The Almanac's second album, Talking Union, also produced by Bernay, was a collection of six labor songs: "Union Maid", "I Don't Want Your Millions Mister", "Get Thee Behind Me Satan", "Union Train", "Which Side Are You On?", and the eponymous "Talking Union". This album, issued in July 1941, was not anti-Roosevelt but was criticized in a review by Time magazine, nevertheless. It was reissued by Folkways in 1955 with additional songs and is still available today. The Almanacs also issued two albums of traditional folk songs with no political content in 1941: an album of sea chanteys, Deep Sea Chanteys and Whaling Ballads (sea chanteys, as was well known, being Franklin Roosevelt's favorite kind of song) and Sod-Buster Ballads, which were songs of the pioneers. Both of these were produced by Alan Lomax on General, the label that had issued his Jelly Roll Morton recordings in 1940. When the USA entered the European war after Germany's post-Pearl Harbor declaration of war in December 1941, the Almanacs recorded a new topical album for Keynote in support of the war effort, Dear Mr. President, under the supervision of Earl Robinson, that included Woody Guthrie's "Reuben James" (1942).

The title song, "Dear Mr. President", was a solo by Pete Seeger, and its lines expressed his lifelong credo:

Now, Mr. President, / We haven't always agreed in the past, I know, / But that ain't at all important now. / What is important is what we got to do, / We got to lick Mr. Hitler, and until we do, / Other things can wait.//

Now, as I think of our great land . . . / I know it ain't perfect, but it will be someday, / Just give us a little time. // This is the reason that I want to fight, / Not 'cause everything's perfect, or everything's right. / No, it's just the opposite: I'm fightin' because / I want a better America, and better laws, / And better homes, and jobs, and schools, / And no more Jim Crow, and no more rules like / "You can't ride on this train 'cause you're a Negro," / "You can't live here 'cause you're a Jew,"/ "You can't work here 'cause you're a union man."//

So, Mr. President, / We got this one big job to do / That's lick Mr. Hitler and when we're through, / Let no one else ever take his place / To trample down the human race. / So what I want is you to give me a gun / So we can hurry up and get the job done.

In 1942, Army intelligence and the FBI determined that the Almanacs and their former anti-draft message were still a seditious threat to recruitment and the morale of the war effort among blacks and youth, and they were hounded by hostile reviews, exposure of their Communist ties and negative coverage in the New York press, like the headline "Commie Singers try to Infiltrate Radio". They disbanded in late 1942 or early 1943. It has been suggested that the popularity and credibility of the group were affected by the constantly changing policies of the Communist Party and uncertainty about where their music stood in relation to these changes.

In 1945, after the end of the war, Millard Lampell went on to become a successful screenwriter, writing under a pseudonym while blacklisted. In 1943, Woody Guthrie wrote and published his famous semi-autobiographical book "Bound for Glory". Later that year he joined the Merchant Marines with fellow (non-Almanac) folksinger Cisco Houston, and would be drafted into the army until late 1945; Woody afterwards performed solo and with others (but not as part of an organized band) until becoming progressively overcome by Huntington's Disease in the mid 1950s. The other founding Almanac members Pete Seeger and Lee Hays became President and Executive Secretary, respectively, of People's Songs, an organization with the goal of providing protest music to union activists, repeal of the Taft-Hartley Act, and electing Henry A. Wallace on the third, Progressive Party, ticket. People's Songs disbanded in 1948, after the defeat of Wallace. Seeger and Hays, joined by two of Hays' young friends, Ronnie Gilbert and Fred Hellerman, then began singing together again at fund-raising folk dances, with a repertoire geared to international folk music. The new singing group, appearing for a while in 1949 under the rubric, "The Nameless Quartet", changed their name to The Weavers and went on to achieve great renown.

== Discography ==
=== Original studio albums ===
- Songs for John Doe (Almanac Records, 1941).
- Talking Union (Keynote, 1941).
- Deep Sea Chanteys and Whaling Ballads (General, 1941).
- Sod Buster Ballads (General, 1941).
- Dear Mr. President (Keynote, 1942).
- Songs of the Lincoln Battalion (Stinson/Asch, 1940). This album was not credited to the Almanac Singers, but to several individuals who were members of the band (Pete Seeger, Bess Lomax, and Butch Hawes) along with Tom Glazer. In 1961, this record was reissued by Folkways Records as one side of an LP entitled Songs of the Spanish Civil War, Vol. 1 (FH5436). The flip side of the LP was a re-release of the 1938 album Six Songs for Democracy, by Ernst Busch and the chorus of the Thälmann Battalion, 11th International Brigade.

=== Singles ===
- Song For Bridges / Babe of Mine (Keynote, 1941).
- Boomtown Bill / Keep That Oil A-Rollin (Keynote, 1942).

=== Compilations ===
- Talking Union & Other Union Songs (Smithsonian Folkways, 1973)
- Their Complete General Recordings (MCA, 1996)
- Songs of Protest (Prism, 2001)
- Talking Union, Vol. 1 (Naxos, 2001)
- The Sea, The Soil & The Struggle (Naxos, 2004)
