= The Complete Studio Recordings =

The Complete Studio Recordings may refer to:

- The Complete Studio Recordings (ABBA album)
- The Complete Studio Recordings (The Doors album)
- The Complete Studio Recordings (Led Zeppelin album)
- The Complete Studio Recordings (Roxy Music album)
