= Sam Gary =

American singer

- Born: February 19, 1917; Florida
- Died: July 20, 1986 (aged 69)
- Genres: blues and folk
- Occupation: singer

Sam Gary (February 19, 1917 – July 20, 1986) was an American blues and folk singer known for his collaboration with Josh White.

Born in Florida, Gary in the 1940s was a member of Josh White and His Carolinians and the Almanac Singers. In 1956, he recorded an album for Tom Wilson's Transition Records that was later released on the British record label Esquire. it was produced by Dean Gitter and with guitar accompaniment by Josh White.

After retiring from music, Sam Gary moved to Aiken, South Carolina with his wife. He died July 20, 1986 in a fire.
