= Songs of the Lincoln Brigade =

Studio album by Baldwin 'Butch' Hawes, Bess Lomax Hawes, Pete Seeger, Tom Glazer
- Released: 1940
- Genre: Folk
- Length: 15:05
- Label: Asch
- Producer: Moses Asch

Songs of the Lincoln Brigade is a 1940 album by several members of the Almanac Singers: Baldwin 'Butch' Hawes, Bess Lomax Hawes and Pete Seeger, along with Tom Glazer. The album presents "the songs of the men who left home and safety behind them in 1937 to fight Fascism" in Spain.

== Track listing ==
No.	Title	Writer(s)	Length
1.	"Jarama Valley"	Alec McDade	2:47
2.	"Cookhouse: The Young Man From Alcalá"	Leonard P. Breedlove, Andrew Young	2:37
3.	"Quartermaster Song"	Lewis E. Jones	2:02
4.	"Viva La Quince Brigada (Long Live the 15th Brigade)"		2:45
5.	"El Quinto Regimiento (The Fifth Regiment)"		2:18
6.	"Si Me Quieres Escribir (If You Want to Write to Me)"		2:36
