= Josh White =

American musician, actor, and civil rights activist (1915–1969)

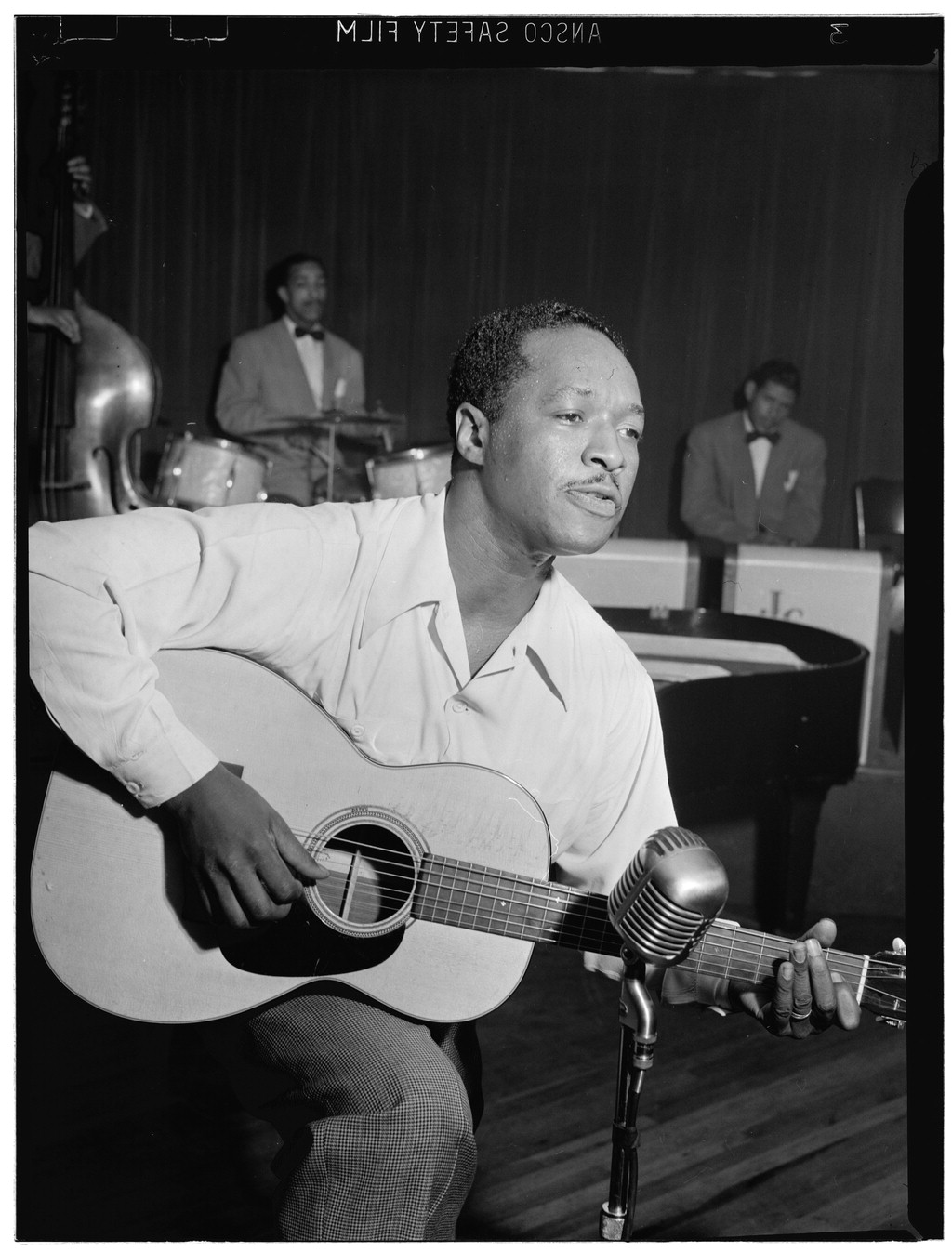
- White at the Café Society, c. June 1946

Background information
- Also known as: Pinewood Tom, Tippy Barton
- Born: Joshua Daniel White; February 11, 1914; Greenville, South Carolina, US
- Died: September 5, 1969 (aged 55) Manhasset, New York, US
- Genres: Piedmont blues, country blues, topical, folk
- Occupations: Singer; actor; songwriter
- Instruments: Vocals, guitar
- Years active: 1928–69
- Labels: Paramount, ARC, Decca, Elektra

Joshua Daniel White (February 11, 1914 – September 5, 1969) was an American singer, guitarist, songwriter, actor and civil rights activist. He also recorded under the names Pinewood Tom and Tippy Barton in the 1930s.

White grew up in the South during the 1920s and 1930s. He became a prominent race records artist, with a prolific output of recordings in genres including Piedmont blues, country blues, gospel music, and social protest songs. In 1931, White moved to New York, and within a decade his fame had spread widely. His repertoire expanded to include urban blues, jazz, traditional folk songs, and political protest songs, and he was in demand as an actor on radio, Broadway, and film.

However, White's anti-segregationist and international human rights political stance presented in many of his recordings and in his speeches at rallies were subsequently used by McCarthyites as a pretext for labeling him a communist to slander and harass him. From 1947 through the mid-1960s, White was caught up in the anti-communist Red Scare, and as a consequence his career suffered. Nonetheless, White's musical style would go on to influence several generations of musical artists. In 2023, he was inducted in the Blues Hall of Fame.

== Career ==
=== Early years ===
White was born on February 11, 1914, in the black section of Greenville, South Carolina, one of the four children of Reverend Dennis and Daisy Elizabeth White. His father told him that he was named after the Biblical character Joshua of the Old Testament. His mother introduced him to music when he was five years old, at which age he began singing in his church's choir. White's father threw a white bill collector out of his home in 1921, for which he was beaten so badly that he nearly died, and then was locked up in a mental institution, where he died nine years later.

Two months after his father had been taken away from the family, White left home with Blind Man Arnold, a black street singer, whom he agreed to lead across the South and for whom he would collect coins after performances. Arnold would then send White's mother two dollars a week. Arnold soon realized that he could profit from this gifted boy, who quickly learned to dance, sing, and play the tambourine. Over the next eight years, he rented the boy's services to other blind street singers, including Blind Blake and Blind Joe Taggart, and in time White mastered the varied guitar stylings of all of them. In order to appear sympathetic to the onlookers tossing coins, the old men kept White shoeless and in ragged short pants until he was sixteen years old. At night he slept in cotton fields or in horse stables, often on an empty stomach, while his employer slept in a black hotel.

While guiding Taggart in 1927, White arrived in Chicago, Illinois. Mayo Williams, a producer for Paramount Records, recognized White's talents and began using him as a session guitarist. He backed many artists for recordings before recording his first popular Paramount record as the lead vocalist and lead guitarist on "Scandalous and a Shame", billed as "Blind Joe Taggart & Joshua White", thus becoming the youngest artist of the "race records" era. He was still shoeless and sleeping in horse stables, with all his payments for recordings going to Taggart and Arnold. After Williams left Paramount to start his own label in Chicago, he threatened that if Taggart did not pay White for his recording services he would call the authorities and have Taggart arrested for indentured servitude and keeping the boy out of school. For a few months after Taggart released him from servitude, White shared a room with Blind Blake at Williams's home before finding his own room in a boarding house. Finally, he was being paid for his recordings and for the first time in his life was able to buy proper clothes and shoes. For the next two years, White continued an active recording schedule in Chicago, until he had saved enough money to return to Greenville and take care of his mother and younger siblings.

=== 1930s: The Singing Christian and Pinewood Tom ===
Late in 1930, ARC Records, based in New York, sent two A&R men to find White, the lead boy who had recorded for Paramount in 1928. After several months of searching, they found him recovering from a broken leg at his mother's home in Greenville. They persuaded her to sign a recording contract for her underage son, promising that they would record only religious songs and not the "devil's music" (the blues). White then moved to New York City and recorded religious songs for ARC, billed as "Joshua White, the Singing Christian".

In a few months, having recorded his repertoire of religious songs, White was persuaded by ARC to record blues songs and to work as a session musician for other artists. White, 18 years old and still underage, signed a new contract under the name Pinewood Tom in 1932. This name was used only on his blues recordings. ARC used his birth name for new gospel recordings and soon added "The Singing Christian". ARC also released his recordings under the name Tippy Barton during this period. As a session guitarist, White recorded with Leroy Carr and Scrapper Blackwell, Buddy Moss, Charlie Spand, the Carver Boys, Walter Roland, and Lucille Bogan.

In February 1936, he punched his left hand through a glass door during a bar fight, and the hand became infected with gangrene. Doctors recommended amputation of the hand, which White repeatedly refused. Amputation was averted, but his chording hand was left immobile. He retreated from his recording career to become a dock worker, an elevator operator, and a building superintendent. During the time when his hand was lame, he squeezed a small rubber ball to try to revive it.

One night during a card game, White's left hand was revived completely. He immediately began practicing playing the guitar and soon put together a group, Josh White and His Carolinians, with his brother Billy and close friends Carrington Lewis, Sam Gary, and Bayard Rustin. They soon began playing private parties in Harlem. At one of these parties, on New Year's Eve 1938, Leonard De Paur, a Broadway choral director, was intrigued by White's singing. For the past six months, DePaur and the producers of a Broadway musical in development, John Henry, had been searching America for an actor, singer, and guitarist to play the lead role of Blind Lemon, a street minstrel who wandered back and forth across the stage narrating the story in song. Their initial auditions with native New York singers were unsuccessful, so they looked through previous race record releases to find a suitable artist. They eventually narrowed their search down to two people, Pinewood Tom and The Singing Christian, both pseudonyms used by White.

=== 1940s: "Josh White and His Guitar" ===
After months of rehearsals and out-of-town productions in Philadelphia and Boston, John Henry opened on Broadway on January 10, 1940, with Paul Robeson as John Henry and White as Blind Lemon Jefferson. The musical did not have a long run, but it boosted White's career. He began working with Woody Guthrie, Lead Belly, Burl Ives, and the Golden Gate Quartet in the CBS radio series Back Where I Come From, written by folk-song collector Alan Lomax and directed by Nicholas Ray. Ray later produced live engagements and recordings for two historic duos of which White was a member. The first of these was the duo of White and Lead Belly, who had a six-month engagement at New York's Village Vanguard nightclub, teaming the young and virile city blues singer—the "Joe Louis of the Blues Guitar"—with the older, white-haired country blues singer—the "King of the 12 String Guitar" (appellations given to them by Woody Guthrie in his Daily Worker newspaper review of their show). "Josh White & Lead Belly" achieved great publicity, the excitement of sold-out shows, positive reviews, recordings, and film shorts. Forty-five years after the event, Max Gordon, the owner of the Village Vanguard, wrote in his memoir Live at the Village Vanguard, "The greatest conversations ever heard at the Vanguard was the carving out of the guitars between Lead Belly and Josh White."

The second duo produced by Ray teamed White with Libby Holman, a white "torch singer" of the 1920s, who was branded an immoral woman for allegedly killing her millionaire husband. Their pairing created more publicity and controversy for White, as they were the first mixed-race male and female artists to perform together, record together and tour together in previously segregated venues across the United States. They continued performing off and on for the next six years, while making an album and a film together. White and Holman frequently requested that the War Department send them overseas during World War II to give USO concert performances for the troops. Despite a letter of recommendation from Eleanor Roosevelt, they were repeatedly rejected as "too controversial", considering that the U.S. Armed Forces were still segregated throughout World War II. Meanwhile, White's album Harlem Blues: Josh White Trio (with Sidney Bechet and Wilson Myers, on the Blue Note label) produced the hit single "Careless Love", and his controversial Columbia Records album Joshua White & His Carolinians: Chain Gang, produced by John Hammond, was the first race record ever played on the white radio stations[clarification needed] and record stores in America's South and caused such a furor that it reached the desk of President Franklin Roosevelt. On December 20, 1940, White and the Golden Gate Quartet, sponsored by Eleanor Roosevelt, gave a historic concert in Washington, D.C., at the Library of Congress's Coolidge Auditorium to celebrate the 75th anniversary of the Thirteenth Amendment to the Constitution of the United States, which abolished slavery (the live recording of this concert was released on CD in 2005).

One month later, White and the Golden Gate Quartet performed at the inauguration of President Roosevelt in Washington. White refashioned his music, performance and image with his re-emergence on the entertainment scene in 1939 and 1940. The industry and audiences alike no longer saw a southern black country boy, but instead a mature, self-educated, articulate, outspoken and sophisticated 26-year-old man, who possessed a strikingly handsome and sexual bearing and personality both on and off the stage. He soon became the first blues performer to attract a large white and middle-class African-American following and was the first African-American artist to perform in previously segregated venues in the US, as he transcended the typical racial and social barriers of the time who associated blues with a rural and working-class African-American audience, while performing in nightclubs and theaters during the 1930s and 1940s.

During the 1940s, as a matinee idol with magnetic sexual charisma and a commanding stage presence, White not only was an international star of recordings, concerts, nightclubs, radio, film, and Broadway but also achieved a unique position for an African American of the segregated era by becoming accepted and befriended by white society, aristocracy, European royalty, and America's ruling family, the Roosevelts. One of his most popular recordings during the 1940s was "One Meatball", ^{lyrics} a song about a little man who could afford only one meatball. The song is an adaptation by the American songwriters Hy Zaret and Lou Singer of a song called "Lay of the One Fishball" ^{lyrics} by Harvard professor George Martin Lane, which was to the tune of an English folk song called "Sucking Cider Through a Straw" ^{lyrics}. When offered the song, he immediately recorded it, and it became the first million-selling record by a male African-American artist; according to his biographer, Elijah Wald, it was "Josh's biggest hit by far". The Andrews Sisters and Jimmy Savo soon recorded their own versions, which also became hits (other cover versions were recorded in subsequent years by Bing Crosby, Lightnin' Hopkins, Lonnie Donegan, Dave Van Ronk, Ry Cooder, Washboard Jungle, Tom Paxton, and Shinehead).

White's hits from the 1940s include "Jelly, Jelly", a song with sexually charged lyrics, composed by Earl Hines and Billy Eckstine; "The House I Live In (What Is America to Me)", a patriotic American song during World War II, written by Earl Robinson and Lewis Allan, with lyrics describing what White hoped America would become after the war and government-sanctioned segregation ended (White had the first hit record with the song, which he then taught to Frank Sinatra for his MGM film short about the song, which won an Academy Award); "Waltzing Matilda", an Australian folk song taught to White by an Australian sailor backstage at the Cafe Society (White re-arranged the song in a waltz tempo and then donated his services to the government by recording it the next week for the government's V Disc label to boost the morale of the troops overseas; it was an immediate hit); "St. James Infirmary", with new words and music by White; the old English folk song "Lass with the Delicate Air"; "John Henry", with new words and music by White; "Joshua Fit the Battle of Jericho", with new words and music by White; "The Riddle Song (I Gave My Love a Cherry)", a traditional English folk song; "Evil Hearted Man", with words and music by White; "Miss Otis Regrets", by Cole Porter; "Strange Fruit", and"The House of the Rising Sun", with new words and music by White (subsequently recorded by Woody Guthrie, Lead Belly, Dave Van Ronk, Bob Dylan, and the Animals, who set it to a rock beat in 1964).

White recorded in various contexts, sometimes accompanied only by his guitar and sometimes playing with others backing him on guitar and string bass or piano or with jazz ensembles, gospel vocal groups, or a swing jazz band, as in his popular 1945 recording "I Left a Good Deal in Mobile". He performed and recorded with the jazz pianist Mary Lou Williams, and besides his duets with Libby Holman and with Lead Belly, he recorded and performed duets with Buddy Moss and often performed duets with his friend Billie Holiday. He also recorded songs of social and political protest with Woody Guthrie, Pete Seeger, Burl Ives, and Lee Hays in their folk cooperative group the Almanac Singers and in the later group People's Songs, which consisted of the core of musicians and activists who formed Almanac Singers.

In 1945, with the success of his hit single "One Meatball", in addition to his national radio show, his appearance in the film Crimson Canary, and publicity from Café Society, White became the first African-American popular music artist to make a national concert hall tour of America, with the Jamaican singer and dancer Josephine Premice as his opening act. Subsequent concert tours included Ethel Waters, Willie Bryant, Timmie Rogers, the Katherine Dunham Company, the Hall Johnson Choir, Mary Lou Williams, Lillian Fitzgerald, the Chocolateers, and the Three Poms. The success of this tour created a demand for a return tour of American concert halls the following year. On this second tour, the opening act was the innovative dancer and choreographer Pearl Primus, who had worked with him at the Café Society. Primus had choreographed several performance pieces to the music of White, and on this tour they performed these numbers together. She performed these pieces in concerts for the rest of her career.

As an actor between 1939 and 1950, White appeared in dozens of radio dramas, including the classic Norman Corwin plays, and star or co-star on the New York stage in three musicals and three dramatic plays, in addition to appearing in several films. In February 1945, Paramount Pictures in Hollywood optioned John Lomax's projected autobiography, Adventures of a Ballad Hunter, with Bing Crosby to star as Lomax and White as Lead Belly. Lead Belly stayed in California until the end of the year, hoping to be involved in the project, but the film never got past the preproduction stage. White appeared in other films, including The Crimson Canary (1945), in which he portrayed himself; the soundtrack of the film Hans Richter film Dreams That Money Can Buy (1947), in which with Libby Holman he sang the song "The Girl With the Pre-Fabricated Heart" (the film won the Special Prize at the Venice Film Festival and was a contribution to the avant-garde film movement); and the John Sturges film The Walking Hills (1949), in which White co-starred with Randolph Scott, John Ireland, Ella Raines, and Arthur Kennedy, in one of Hollywood's first films in which an African American was portrayed as an equal character in the story.

As a leading artist and activist of the era, who had begun writing and recording political protest songs as early as 1933 and who would speak and sing at human rights rallies, White was prominently associated with the civil rights movement of the 1940s. This activism made White's politics suspect in Hollywood during the McCarthy era and, accordingly, The Walking Hills was his final film role.

== At the Café Society ==
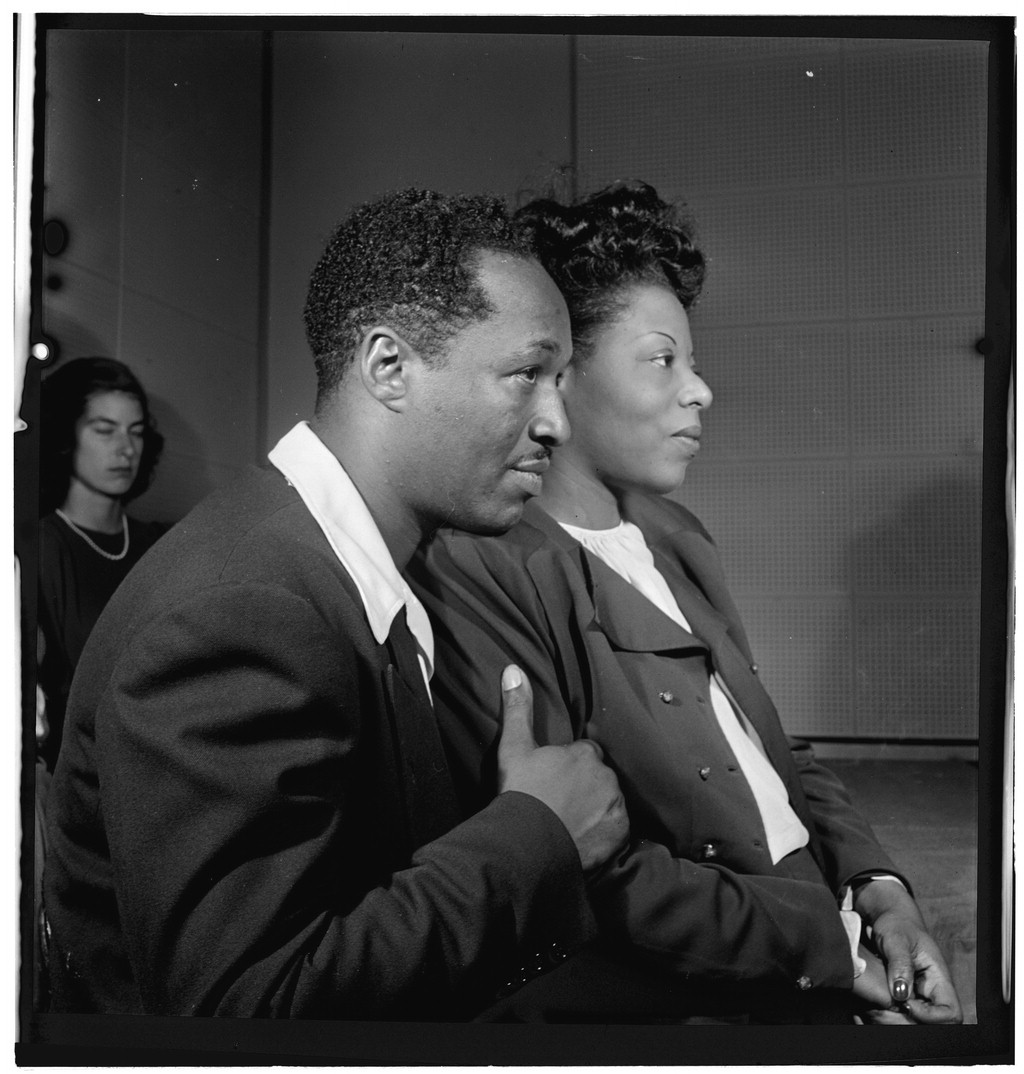
White and Mary Lou Williams, ca. October 1947 (photograph by William P. Gottlieb)

The Café Society nightclub, located in New York's Greenwich Village, opened in late 1938 with a three-month engagement of the Fletcher Henderson Orchestra, Billie Holiday and comedian Jack Gilford, immediately making it New York's hottest club.

One day, John Hammond asked White to meet Barney Josephson, the owner of the club. As soon as Josephson heard White and saw the charisma he exuded, he told Hammond that White was going to become the first black male sex symbol in America. It was Josephson who decided at that first encounter, on the stage apparel he would have designed for White—which would become a trademark for years to come—a black velvet shirt open to the stomach and silk slacks. While starring at the Café Society over the next decade and becoming exposed to audiences, performers and beautiful music from around the world, White expanded his musical interests and repertoire to include various styles which he would subsequently record. He had remarkable success in popularizing recordings in diverse musical genres, which ranged from his original repertoire of Negro blues, gospel and protest songs to Broadway show tunes, cabaret, pop, and white American, English and Australian folk songs.

The Greenwich Village club was so successful that Josephson soon opened a larger Café Society Uptown, at which White also performed, gaining him recognition by The New York Times as the "Darling of Fifth Avenue". The Roosevelt family, New York society, international royalty, and Hollywood stars regularly came to see White at the Café Society, and he used his fame and visibility to create, foster and develop relations between blacks and whites, making him a national figure and voice of racial integration in America.

He was thought to have had numerous romantic liaisons with wealthy society women, singers, and Hollywood actresses, but the rumors were never substantiated. The women in question always referred to White as their close friend, and Lena Horne and Eartha Kitt also referred to him as a mentor.

The Café Society was instrumental in raising White's public profile and afforded him a level of mainstream recognition uncommon for African American entertainers at the time. However, because of the club's unique social status of mixing the races, it also became a haven for New York's social progressives, whose politics were left-leaning. This would also one day play a crucial role in his fall from grace.

== White and the Roosevelts ==
Beginning in 1940, White established a long and close relationship with the family of Franklin and Eleanor Roosevelt, and would become the closest African-American confidant to the President of the United States; and the Roosevelts were the godparents of Josh White Jr. (born November 30, 1940). In January 1941, White performed at the President's Inauguration, and two months later, he released another highly controversial record album, Southern Exposure, which included six anti-segregationist songs with liner notes written by the African-American writer Richard Wright, and the subtitle of which was An Album of Jim Crow Blues. Like the Chain Gang album, and with revelatory yet inflammatory songs such as "Uncle Sam Says", "Jim Crow Train", "Bad Housing Blues", "Defense Factory Blues", "Southern Exposure", and "Hard Time Blues", it also was forced upon southern white radio stations and record stores, caused outrage in the South and also was brought to the attention of President Roosevelt. However, instead of making White persona non grata in segregated America, it resulted in Roosevelt asking White to become the first African-American artist to give a command performance at the White House, in 1941.

After that first White House command performance ended, the Roosevelts invited White into their private chambers, where they spent more than three hours talking about White's life story of growing up in Jim Crow South, listening to his songs written about those experiences, and drinking Café Royale (coffee and brandy). At one point during that evening, the President said to White, "You know, Josh, when I first heard your song 'Uncle Sam Says,' I thought you were referring to me as Uncle Sam....Am I right?" White responded, "Yes, Mr. President, I wrote that song to you after seeing how my brother was treated in the segregated section of Fort Dix army camp.... However that wasn't the first song I wrote to you.... In 1933, I wrote and recorded a song called 'Low Cotton,' about the plight of Negro cotton pickers down South, and in the lyrics I made an appeal directly to you to help their situation." The President, interested and impressed at the candor of his response, then asked White to sing those songs to him again. A friendship developed, and five more command performances followed, in addition to two appearances at the Inaugurations of 1941 and 1945; and the White family would spend many Thanksgiving and Christmas holidays with the Roosevelts at their Hyde Park, New York mansion (Springwood). The President sent White to give concerts overseas as a goodwill ambassador, and he was often referred to in the press as the "Presidential Minstrel". More importantly, it was White's songs of social protest, such as "Uncle Sam Says"^{listen} and "Defense Factory Blues",^{listen} which caused the President to begin exploring how to desegregate the U.S. armed forces. Meanwhile, White's recordings of "Beloved Comrade" (the President's favorite song), "Freedom Road", "Free and Equal Blues", and "House I Live In (What Is America to Me)", were great songs of inspiration to the Roosevelts and the country during World War II. After the President's death, White's younger brother William White became Eleanor Roosevelt's personal assistant, house manager and chauffeur for the remainder of her life. (The Franklin D. Roosevelt Presidential Library and Museum in Hyde Park, New York, has no documentation to either prove or deny this information. There is no correspondence extant between Josh White and either President Roosevelt or First Lady Eleanor Roosevelt during the White House years or after 1945. The information provided here is strictly conjecture.)

In 1949, Fisk University honored White with an honorary doctorate; and the local Chicago NBC radio series Destination Freedom, written by Richard Durham, aired a half-hour dramatized biography of White's life entitled "Help the Blind". In 1950, Eleanor Roosevelt (then the United Nations ambassador in charge of war relief) and White made a historical speaking and concert tour of the capitals of Europe to lift the spirits of those war-torn countries. The tour built to such proportions that when they arrived in Stockholm, the presentation had to be moved from the Opera House to the city's soccer stadium where 50,000 came out in the pouring rain to hear Mrs. Roosevelt speak and White perform. All during this tour, audiences across Europe enthusiastically requested White to sing his famed anti-lynching recording of "Strange Fruit", but on each occasion he would respond, "My mother always told me that when you have problems in your background you don't give those problems to your neighbor....So, that's a song I will sing back home until I never have to sing it again, but for you, I would now like to sing its sister song, written by the same man ('The House I Live In')."

== Movies and theater ==
As an actor, White acted several more times on Broadway in the late 1940s. In 1947 he appeared in German artist and avant-garde filmmaker Hans Richter's Dreams that Money Can Buy, co-starring Libby Holman along with the participation of Max Ernst, Marcel Duchamp, Alexander Calder, Darius Milhaud and Fernand Léger. It won an award at that year's Venice Film Festival. He also appeared in John Sturges' 1949 western The Walking Hills with Randolph Scott, Ella Raines, Edgar Buchanan, and Arthur Kennedy, in which his character, an itinerant musician, was not a stereotype but on equal footing with the white characters. He was still young and handsome at this time, and would have likely enjoyed continued success in film had the Hollywood blacklist not prematurely ended his budding movie career.

== Early 1950s: White and the blacklist ==
White had reached the zenith of his career when touring with Eleanor Roosevelt on a celebrated and triumphant Goodwill tour of Europe. He had been hosted by the continent's prime ministers and royal families, and had just performed before 50,000 cheering fans at Stockholm's soccer stadium. Amidst this tour, while in Paris in June 1950, White received a call from Mary Chase, his manager in New York, telling him that Red Channels (who had been sending newsletters to the media since 1947 about White and other artists who they warned were subversive) had just released and distributed a thick magazine with subversive details regarding 151 artists from the entertainment and media industries whom they labeled communist sympathizers. White's name was prominent on this list. There never had been an official blacklist—until now. White immediately went to discuss the situation with Mrs. Roosevelt—to ask her advice and help. With great empathy, she told him that her voice on his behalf would hinder his efforts to clear his name. She explained that if she wasn't the widow of the president they would also be crucifying her. She continued that the right-wing press had been calling her a "pinko", citing her social activism and friendships with non-whites. That night, White called his manager and alerted her that he would be flying back to America the next day so that he could clear his name. Upon arriving at New York's Idlewild Airport, the FBI met him, took him into a customs holding room, interrogated him, and held him for hours while waiting word from Washington as to whether White, who was born in the United States, would be deported to Europe.

For a decade, White had been a leading voice of black America and a voice that reminded Americans of social injustices, while also becoming a major pop star and sex symbol from his platform at the Cafe Society. However, when Barney Josephson's brother and attorney Leon, who was also a lawyer for the communist-created International Labor Defense, was brought before the House Un-American Activities Committee (HUAC) in 1947 and refused to testify, he was sent to prison. The right-wing media publicity centered on the Cafe Society as a hotbed of communists. By December of that year, the original downtown club had to close, and by 1949, the uptown club was forced to shut its doors. Virtually every artist who regularly worked at the club had contributed to left-leaning benefits and was suspected as being a communist sympathizer.

White was not a communist and was not active in any political party. However, when he was told that people's human rights were being threatened and asked to participate in a benefit or a rally, he was always willing to lend his voice to the cause. Whether it was the plight of African Americans in the South or oppressed people in Yugoslavia, it was all the same to him. Since his return from Europe in June 1950, White had been interrogated every week, and was threatened that his career would be finished and that he would lose his family. Controversially, in a fervent desire to defend his reputation, and challenge his accusers and the blacklist (while under intense pressure from his manager and his family), White told the FBI that he would go to Washington, appear before HUAC and set the record straight.

With the assistance of his daughter Bunny, White began writing a lengthy letter about his life and his beliefs that he would plan to read as a statement at his HUAC appearance. Before going to Washington, he made trips to visit two trusted friends and ask them read his statement—Eleanor Roosevelt and Paul Robeson. Bunny accompanied him on his trip up to Hyde Park to visit Mrs. Roosevelt. She recalled the visit in an interview with Josh White Estate Archival biographer Douglas Yeager: "Mrs. Roosevelt told Daddy that he had written a good letter. However, she cautioned him not to go to Washington, explaining that the HUAC Committee would turn his testimony against him if he appeared and they weren't satisfied with his statement." A few days later, White drove up to Paul Robeson's Connecticut home by himself.

Paul Robeson, a former All-American football player, was a Columbia University-trained African-American attorney fluent in 12 languages, who lived most of the 1920s and 1930s in London and was active in world human rights and the movement to decolonize Africa. However, he was best known as an international star of recordings and film, the most celebrated stage Othello in history, and the highest-paid concert performer in the world. He also was the most respected and admired artist-activist throughout the world, with friendships that included the leaders of many countries including the Soviet Union, where Robeson was considered a cultural and social giant and iconic figure. To the social progressives in America, he was the most respected and important voice of truth and social justice in the world. In 1939, at the onset of World War II in Europe, Paul Robeson and his family returned to America and maintained a residence in Connecticut. Robeson had been White's friend and artistic collaborator for many years and was the godfather to White's daughter Beverly. They did not always agree on everything politically, however White held great respect for Robeson. Years later in a radio interview, White stated that Robeson never once mentioned the Communist Party to him, and in fact advised White not to get too involved with any political party. Robeson supported America's war effort and was considered a patriotic champion of freedom and liberty after his national radio broadcast concert performance and subsequent record album Ballad for Americans. However, when American Negro soldiers returning from the war were still confronted with government sanctioned segregation, racism and even lynchings, it became evident that Robeson was greatly disappointed with the American government. In the postwar years, his socialist belief structure seemed better aligned to the Soviet Union, which had been America's ally in the war, but by 1947 had become their bitter enemy. In 1949, America's media and press reported a speech Robeson had made in [Paris], alleging that he said if a war would ever take place between the USSR and America that American Negroes would not fight in America's army (the U.S. media and press version of the speech has since been found to be inaccurate and slanted).

Before going to Washington, White felt he had to meet with Robeson, ask him read his statement, and tell him of decision to go to Washington. One paragraph out of the long biographical letter referred to Robeson: "I have great admiration for Mr. Robeson as an actor and a great singer, and if what I read in the papers is true, I feel sad over the help he's been giving to people who despise America. He has a right to his own opinions, but when he, or anybody, pretends to talk for a whole race, he's kidding himself. His statement that the Negroes would not fight for their country, against Soviet Russia or any other enemy, is both wrong and an insult: because I stand ready to fight Russian or any enemy of America." In the biography Robeson: Lives of the Left, Martin Duberman wrote about the encounter. Apparently White and Robeson went up to the bathroom of Robeson's master bedroom, turned on all the faucets so that the FBI listening devices couldn't hear their conversation, and began discussing White's statement and his upcoming appearance before HUAC. Robeson read the prepared statement and told White that he personally felt it would be wrong to go to Washington and appear before HUAC. He continued that he would never appear before the Committee, but that this was a decision White would have to make on his own. Reportedly, White painfully told him, "I feel like a heel Paul, but they've got me in a vise... I have to go." White was called into the FBI offices dozens of times between 1947 and 1954, but no one is absolutely certain what special vise they had him in, besides threatening to destroy his career and family, as many of the pages found in his FBI files (via the Freedom of Information Act) are still blacked out by the government. It is the belief of his son, Josh Jr., and many others however, that the FBI, displeased with White's prowess with white women, used it against him (as they had done with Jack Johnson years earlier), by threatening him with imprisonment and saying that they would concoct a trumped-up charge of violating the Mann Act, "for transporting women across state lines for immoral purposes".

On September 1, 1950, White, appearing with only his wife Carol at his side, sat down before HUAC in Washington, D.C., regarding communist influence in the entertainment industry and African-American community. He did not give the HUAC Committee names of Communist Party members. At length, he told them of his life story as a child, seeing his father beaten and dragged through the streets of Greenville by white authorities, and having to leave home at the age of seven to lead street singers across America in order to feed his family. He defended his right and responsibility as a folksinger to bring social injustices to the attention of the public through his songs, and then passionately read the chilling lyrics of one of his most famous recordings, the anti-lynching song "Strange Fruit" (written by Abel Meeropol) which was then placed into the Congressional Record. He also included his words about Paul Robeson regarding the alleged statement Robeson had made in Paris.

White would later defend his testimony as a "friendly witness" (a term applied to those who appeared voluntarily before HUAC) by claiming that he had a right to defend his name against unjust accusations, that the scope of his testimony was limited, that he did not state anything that was not already known, that he never gave the FBI or HUAC names of members of the Communist Party, and that he was sincerely opposed to communism. However, testifying before the committee and speaking out against Paul Robeson angered his large socially progressive fan base, who believed that testifying before the HUAC Committee acknowledged their right to exist. Not being privileged to know the details of his FBI interrogations, many of this group also suspected that he had given the FBI names of Communist Party members, which he had not. The fact that the future career and reputation of baseball legend Jackie Robinson was not hampered when he appeared before the HUAC Committee one year earlier, while expressing virtually the same words as White had about Robeson's alleged statement in Spain, did not seem to matter to White's detractors. Robinson's fan base did not derive from the political left as White's had. White's HUAC appearance greatly affected his posthumous reputation in America, causing him to become the only artist of the era to be blacklisted by both the Right and Left. He felt immense pressures from several sides to appear before the HUAC Committee, and based upon his harsh early life experiences learned in Jim Crow South, it was apparent that White believed his only option to protect the lives of his family and career and to survive, was to figuratively "ride the fence post"—go to Washington, denounce the Communist Party, but not name any names of Communist Party members. In the end, Mrs. Roosevelt had an astute understanding of the political climate in Washington and in America when she warned White that the government would turn his testimony against him. Indeed, this was the case, and White's blacklisting would not be lifted for years.

With work rapidly drying up in America, White relocated to London for much of 1950 to 1955, where he hosted his own BBC radio show, My Guitar Is Old as Father Time, resumed his recording career, with new successes, such as "On Top of Old Smokey", "Lonesome Road", "I Want You and Need You", "Wanderings", "Molly Malone" and "I'm Going to Move to the Outskirts of Town", and gave concert tours throughout Europe and beyond. However, back in the United States—the country of his birth—the McCarthy anti-communist hysteria had already greatly dismembered White's career as early as 1947, when he lost his record contract and his national radio show, and was barred from appearing on other radio shows. His Hollywood blacklisting began in 1948, after completing his final film role in The Walking Hills, and he would not be allowed to appear on U.S. television from 1948 until 1963. Meanwhile, the 1940s politically Left-leaning social progressives who had survived the Red Scare, had begun reviving the folk music industry in America. They would keep White shut out from their folk festivals, their folk magazines, their emerging record companies, and their media and press for most of the remaining years of his life.

== Later life ==
=== 1955–1969 ===
From the mid-1950s until his death in 1969 from heart disease in Manhasset, New York, White primarily performed in concert halls, nightclubs, and folk music venues and festivals around the world outside America.

In 1955, the founder of a new American record company, Jac Holzman, offered White the opportunity to record again in his home country. He could only offer him $100, but he promised him artistic control and the best recording equipment available. They recorded the Josh White: 25th Anniversary album, which established Elektra Records and slowly began reviving White's career by finding a young, new audience who made it possible for him to work again in America.

At the same time the UK guitarist and entrepreneur Ivor Mairants worked with White to create The Josh White Guitar Method (Boosey & Hawkes) in 1956. This was the first blues guitar instruction book ever published, and was an influential book for the fledgling UK blues and folk scene. The UK guitarist John Renbourn and the American guitarist Stefan Grossman (who was living in the UK at the time) have cited it as a critical influence on their playing, and in 1961 he starred in The Josh White Show for Granada Television (a franchise holder for the commercial ITV network) in the United Kingdom.

White's blacklisting in the American television industry was finally broken in 1963, when President John F. Kennedy invited him to appear on the national CBS television's civil rights special "Dinner with the President". Kennedy told him how his records had inspired him when he was a college student in the Roosevelt era. Later that year he was seen again on national television performing for the people on the steps of the Lincoln Memorial at the historic March on Washington.

In 1964, White gave a command performance for Lester Pearson, the Prime Minister of Canada, and in January 1965 he performed at the inauguration of President Lyndon Baines Johnson. In his final years, he would make American television appearances on The Merv Griffin Show, Hugh Hefner's Playboy's Penthouse and Hootenanny, among others. Meanwhile, he starred in two concert specials for national Swedish television in 1962 and 1967; starred in the 1965 ITV Network special Heart Song: Josh White in the United Kingdom (with guest artists Julie Felix and Alexis Korner); was a guest star on the Canadian CBC-TV program Let's Sing Out with Oscar Brand in 1967; and made his final television appearance in May 1969 on the CBC-TV variety show One More Time.

=== Signature guitars ===
The success of the 1956 book The Josh White Guitar Method prompted Mairants to commission a Zenith "Josh White" signature guitar based on White's Martin 0021 from the German guitar maker Oscar Teller. The Scottish guitarist Bert Jansch owned one of these models in his early playing years. On the last page of Josh White Guitar Method (printed in 1956) is a photo of this Zenith Josh White signature guitar and some text about it.

The Guild Guitar Company in the US worked with White on a signature model in 1965. This fact was confirmed in a TV program, The History Detectives, by Mark Dronge, whose father, Al, was one of the founders of Guild Guitars. Dronge took White to the Guild factory in 1965. A guitar made to White's specifications was meant to become a signature guitar for White, but it was never mass-produced. Dronge explained that "The scene was starting to change. The Beatles were so influential and all these bands came out and the electric music was getting bigger and the plans for Josh White model just kind of fell by the wayside, unfortunately."

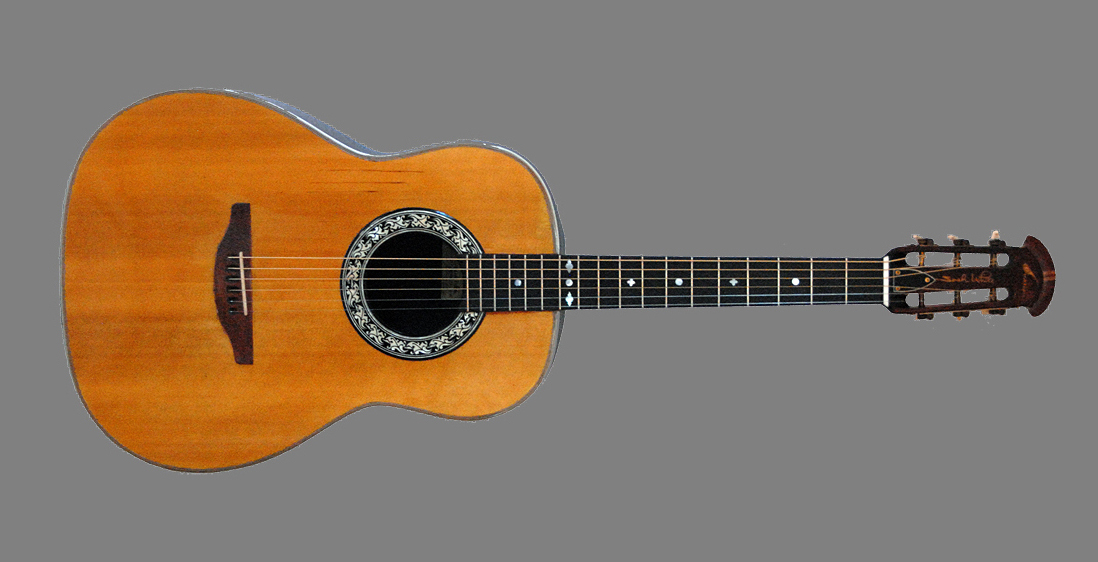
White's custom-made Ovation guitar, 1965–66

Carol White vividly recounted to White's archival biographer, Douglas Yeager, that in 1963 and 1964 the engineers of a new guitar company in development spent several months with their paperwork and drawings on her dining room table, as White and the engineers designed the first round-bodied guitar. Upon completion, the first Ovation Guitar was called the Josh White Model.

According to the "Ovation Original Program" White played the Josh White Model Ovation guitar at the Hotel America, in Hartford, Connecticut, on November 14, 1966.

In 1965–1967, the Ovation Guitar Company made a signature guitar for White, which was the first made for an African American. White was the first official Ovation endorser.

An article in Music Trades magazine in December 1966 stated that

"Earlier this year, the present double parabolic form was perfected after extensive consultations with professional guitarists including the pioneering guitar folk singer, Josh White.

"Ovation Instruments unveiled their new line of acoustical guitars at a reception and dinner held last month at the Hotel America, Hartford, Conn. In a program which featured demonstrations by White, one of Americas best-known folk singers, and the Balladeers, a new, young, singing group; and remarks by Charles Kaman, president of Kaman Aircraft Corporation, parent company of Ovation Instruments, and Jim D. Gurley, program manager of Ovation Instruments, the features of the Ovation guitar models were presented to 300 representatives of the press and the music industry.

=== Fingernail problems ===
White had a hands-on influence on Ovation. White used to come to the factory. His fingernails were brittle and prone to cracking due to psoriasis, a condition that got worse as he grew older. Ovation's subassembly foreman, Al Glemboski, made a cast of White's fingers, from which he made a set of fiberglass nails. White glued on these false nails with an industrial glue, Eastman 910, which would later be marketed as Super Glue. He returned to the factory every other month for a new set of nails.

== Death ==
In 1961, White's health began a sharp decline after he had the first of the three heart attacks and the progressive heart disease that would plague him over his final eight years. As a lifelong smoker he also had progressive emphysema, in addition to ulcers, and severe psoriasis in his hands and calcium deficiency, which caused the skin to peel from his fingers and left his fingernails broken and bleeding after every concert. During the last two years of his life, as his heart weakened dramatically, his wife put him in the hospital for four weeks after he completed each two-week concert tour. Finally, his doctors felt his only survival option was to attempt a new procedure to replace heart valves. The surgery failed, and White died on September 5, 1969, at North Shore University Hospital in Manhasset, New York, aged 55.

Harry Belafonte, after learning of White's death, said in an interview with the Associated Press, "I can't tell you how sad I am. I spent many, many hours with him in the years of my early development. He had a profound influence on my style. At the time I came along, he was the only popular black folk singer, and through his artistry exposed America to a wealth of material about the life and conditions of black people that had not been sung by any other artist."

== Legacy ==
White was in many senses a trailblazer: popular country bluesman in the early 1930s, responsible for introducing a mass white audience to folk-blues in the 1940s, and the first black singer-guitarist to star in Hollywood films and on Broadway. On one hand he was famous for his civil rights songs, which made him a favorite of the Roosevelts, and on the other he was known for his sexy stage persona (a first for a black male artist).

He was the first black singer to give a White House command performance (1941), to perform in previously segregated hotels (1942), to get a million-selling record ("One Meatball", 1944), and the first to make a solo concert tour of America (1945). He was also the first folk and blues artist to perform in a nightclub, the first to tour internationally, and (along with Lead Belly and Woody Guthrie) the first to be honored with a US postage stamp.

White and Libby Holman became the first mixed-race male and female artists to perform together, record together and tour together in previously segregated venues across the United States. They continued performing off and on for the next six years, while making an album and a film together.

White was seen as an influence on hundreds of artists of diverse musical styles, including: Pete Seeger, Lee Hays, Oscar Brand, Ed McCurdy, Lonnie Donegan, Alexis Korner, Cy Coleman, Elvis Presley, Joel Grey, Bob Gibson, Dave Van Ronk, Phish, Clancy Brothers and Tommy Makem, Shel Silverstein, John Fahey, Bob Dylan, Peter, Paul and Mary, Judy Collins, Roger McGuinn, David Crosby, Mike Bloomfield, Danny Kalb, Ry Cooder, John Fogerty, Don McLean, Robert Plant and Eva Cassidy; in addition to those African-American artists, such as Lena Horne, Nat King Cole, Pearl Primus, Josephine Premice, Eartha Kitt, Harry Belafonte, Odetta, Ray Charles, Josh White Jr., Jackie Washington, The Chambers Brothers, and Richie Havens, who in the footsteps of White were also able to break considerable barriers that had hampered African-American artists in the past.

== Song and poetry tributes ==
- The folk singer Bob Gibson and his writing partner, Shel Silverstein, wrote and recorded the song "Heavenly Choir" in 1979, a tribute to three of their most beloved artists, White, Hank Williams and Janis Joplin. The first verse is about White.
- Peter Yarrow, of Peter, Paul & Mary and a protégé of White's, eulogized him in the song "Goodbye Josh", which was included on his first solo album, Peter.
- Jack Williams wrote and recorded "A Natural Man", a tribute to White, on his album Walkin' Dreams in 2002.
- The poet and historian Leatrice Emeruwa published the poem "Josh White Is Dead" in 1970.

== Personal life ==
In 1933, White married Carol Carr, a New York gospel singer. They raised Blondell (Bunny), Julianne (Beverly), Josh Jr., Carolyn (Fern), Judy, and a foster daughter, Delores, in their home in the Sugar Hill section of Harlem, New York. White's younger brother Billy (who he moved up from Greenville) and Carol's mother lived with them in the White household. His father died in a South Carolina mental institution in 1930, the result of beatings at the hands of Greenville deputies a decade earlier. His mother, Daisy Elizabeth, a stern and religious woman, remained in her hometown of Greenville and lived into her 80s. She came to visit White in New York several times a year, and he traveled to see her in South Carolina, but she did not allow his non-religious recordings in her home. Except for his childhood performances in her Greenville church in the 1920s, she never again saw her son perform, refusing to attend concerts where he sang non-sacred songs. His brother Billy and (future civil rights leader) Bayard Rustin, Sam Gary and Carrington Lewis performed and recorded with White as Josh White and His Carolinians (from 1939 to 1940) and appeared with him in the Broadway musical John Henry. After World War II, Billy became Eleanor Roosevelt's house manager and chauffeur for the remainder of her life.

On occasion in the early 1940s, when the grandmother watched the children, Carol would join White in singing, performing and recording with the folk collaborative group, the Almanac Singers. In the late 1950s and early 1960s, Carol was a guest on Eleanor Roosevelt's television talk show, and in 1982 she was a featured speaker at the Smithsonian Institution's 100th anniversary celebration of the birth of Franklin D. Roosevelt in Washington, while her son, Josh White Jr., performed a musical program of songs his father had presented at one of his White House command performances. Josh White Jr., a successful singer-songwriter, guitarist, actor, educator, and social activist for the past 60 years, performed and recorded with his father as a duet from 1944 to 1961 and performed with him in two Broadway plays (Josh White Jr., won a 1949 Tony Award for the play How Long Till Summer). At various times in the 1950s and 1960s, White's daughters Beverly, Fern, and Judy also performed, recorded and appeared on radio and television with him. In 1964, when new anti-segregationist legislation made it easier for African Americans to purchase real estate in previously all-white neighborhoods, White and his wife bought a duplex in the Rosedale, Queens section of New York City. His daughter Beverly and her family lived upstairs, and White and his wife lived downstairs. White lived in this semi-suburban home for the rest of his life. Carol White continued to live there and worked until she was in her 80s, first as manager of a clothing boutique and then as a social worker serving people in nursing homes, until her sudden death in 1998. One week before her fatal heart attack, she received final confirmation that the United States Postal Service would honor White in 1998 with a postage stamp. When shown a mock-up photograph of the stamp by White's estate manager, Douglas Yeager, she expressed joy, gratitude and a long-awaited satisfaction that after all those painful years of social isolation in the McCarthy era, White would be receiving this recognition. She felt that she could finally go in peace.

== Posthumous honors ==
- In 1983, Josh White Jr., starred in the long-running and rave-reviewed biographical dramatic musical stage play on his father's life, Josh: The Man & His Music, written and directed by Broadway veteran Peter Link, which premiered at the Michigan Public Theatre in Lansing. Subsequently, the state of Michigan formally proclaimed April 20, 1983, to be Josh White & Josh White Jr. Day.
- In 1984, when asked why his father's recordings were so hard to find, Josh White Jr. said, "Normally, when a person of my old man's stature passes away, a flood of re-releases and best-of packages are dumped on the market. But when he died [...] there was only one memorial album that Elektra put out and, after that, there was nothing. That's why in my performances I never omit a section devoted to my father's songs, his interpretations of other people's songs, and his style of guitar playing."
- In 1987, the Josh White Jr. tribute album to his father's music, Jazz, Ballads and Blues (Rykodisc, produced by Douglas Yeager), received a Grammy nomination.
- In 1996, Josh White Jr. released a well-received second tribute album to his father's music, entitled House of the Rising Son (Silverwolf, produced by Josh White Jr., Douglas Yeager and Peter Link).
- On June 26, 1998, the United States Postal Service issued a 32-cent postage stamp honoring White, unveiling it on the National Mall, in Washington, D.C., followed by a concert tribute of his songs by Josh White Jr. In the same year, Smithsonian Folkways released an album of White's work, entitled Free and Equal Blues, his only solo album released on the label (though he was featured on several compilation works both before and after).
- From 2002 to 2006, the historic Americana show Glory Bound, which starred Odetta, Ramblin' Jack Elliott, Oscar Brand, and Josh White, Jr., toured America, in a salute to the first three folk and blues artists to be honored with U.S. postage stamps, Josh White, Lead Belly and Woody Guthrie.
- On February 27, 2010, a 36-inch high bust of White was unveiled at the LeQuire Gallery in Nashville, Tennessee. It is part of an exhibit by the sculptor Alan LeQuire entitled "Cultural Heroes", which will tour museums across America from 2010 until at least 2019. The exhibit's other cultural heroes, whose busts are honored alongside White, were Bessie Smith, Paul Robeson, Marian Anderson, Lead Belly, Woody Guthrie and Billie Holiday.
- August 20, 2016, was declared Josh White Day by White's hometown of Greenville, South Carolina. Greenville is also planning to place a bronze sculpture honoring White downtown sometime in 2018.

== Filmography ==
- 1945: The Crimson Canary. Directed by John Hoffman.
- 1947: Dreams That Money Can Buy. Directed by Hans Richter.
- 1949: The Walking Hills. Directed by John Sturges.
- 1998: The Guitar of Josh White. Homespun Videos. (An instructional video featuring Josh White Jr. showing his father's pioneering guitar techniques.)
- 2000: Josh White: Free and Equal Blues, Rare Performances. DVD. Vestapol.
- 2010: Hugh Hefner: Playboy, Activist and Rebel. Written and directed by Brigitte Berman

=== Other films containing recordings by White ===
- 1994: Earl Robinson: Ballad of an American. Directed by Bette Jean Bullett.
- 2001: Jazz, Episode Seven: "Dedicated to Chaos". Directed by Ken Burns.
- 2003: Strange Fruit. Directed by Joel Katz.
- 2006: Red Tailed Angels: The Story of the Tuskegee Airmen. Directed by Pare Lorentz.
- 2006: Negroes with Guns: Rob Williams and Black Power. Directed by Sandra Dickson and Churchill Roberts.
- 2009: History Detectives. Episode: "In Search of Josh White's Guitar".
- 2009: American Folk. Part 3, of BBC4's five-part series.
- 2010: Our World War II Fathers. Directed by Les Easter.

== See also ==
- For an in depth discography, see https://www.wirz.de/music/whitejos.htm
- List of people on stamps of the United States
- Union Boys
