= Lee Hays =

American folksinger-songwriter (1914–1981)

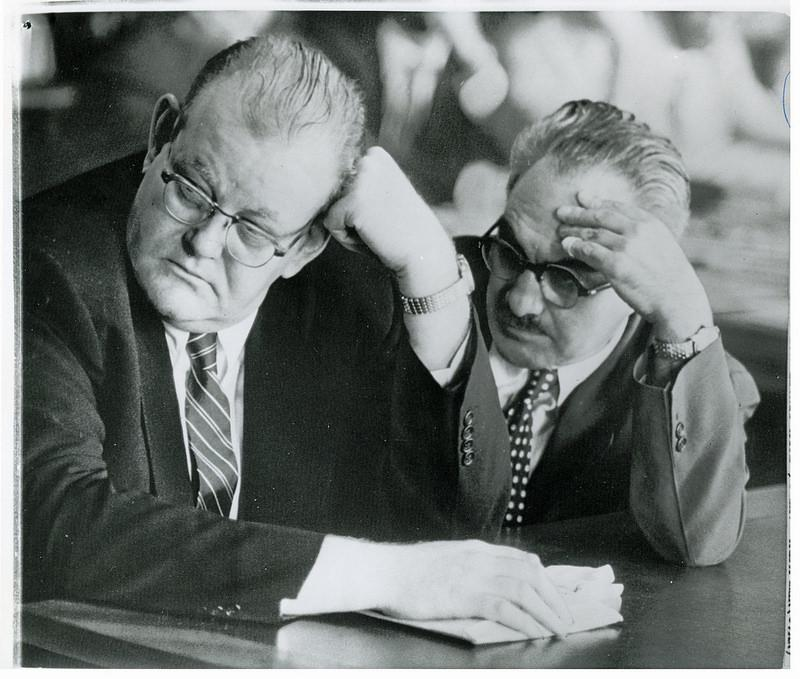
- Hays (left) at the House Committee on Un-American Activities

Background information
- Born: Lee Elhardt Hays; March 14, 1914; Little Rock, Arkansas, U.S.
- Died: August 26, 1981 (aged 67) Croton-on-Hudson, New York, U.S.
- Genres: Folk music
- Occupation: Singer

Lee Elhardt Hays (March 14, 1914 – August 26, 1981) was an American folk singer and songwriter, best known for singing bass with the Weavers. Throughout his life, he was concerned with overcoming racism, inequality, and violence in society. He wrote or cowrote "Lonesome Traveller", "Wasn't That a Time?", "If I Had a Hammer", and "Kisses Sweeter than Wine", which became hits and Weavers' staples. He also familiarized audiences with songs of the 1930s labor movement, such as "We Shall Not Be Moved".

== Childhood ==
Hays came naturally by his interest in folk music since his uncle was the eminent Missouri and Arkansas folklorist Vance Randolph, author of, among other works, the bestselling Pissing in the Snow and Other Ozark Folktales and Who Blewed Up the Church House?. Hays' social conscience was ignited when at age five he witnessed public lynchings of African-Americans.

He was born in Little Rock, Arkansas, the youngest of the four children of William Benjamin Hays, a Methodist minister, and Ellen Reinhardt Hays, who before her marriage had been a court stenographer. William Hays's vocation of ministering to rural areas took him from parish to parish, so, as a child, Lee lived in several towns in Arkansas and Georgia. He learned to sing Sacred Harp music in his father's church. Both his parents valued learning and books. Mrs. Hays taught her four children to type before they began learning penmanship in school, and all were excellent students. There was a gap in age of ten years between Lee and next oldest sibling, his brother Bill.

In 1927, when Lee was thirteen, his childhood came to an abrupt end as tragedy struck the family. The Reverend Hays was killed in an automobile accident on a remote road and soon afterward Lee's mother had to be hospitalized for a mental breakdown from which she never recovered. Lee's sister, who had begun teaching at Hendrix-Henderson College, also broke down temporarily and had to quit her job to move in with their oldest brother in Boston, Massachusetts.

== Teenage years ==
The period immediately following his father's death was so painful that Lee Hays could not bring himself to talk much about it, even to Doris Willens, the writer he selected to be his biographer. His brothers, both recently married, sent him to Emory Junior College in Georgia from which he graduated in 1930 at sixteen (but already over six feet tall and looking much older than his years). He traveled alone to enroll at Hendrix-Henderson College (now Henderson State University) in Arkansas, the Methodist school that his father and siblings had attended, but the expense of their mother's institutionalization and the effects of the Wall Street Crash of 1929 meant that college tuition money was not available for Lee. Instead he moved to Cleveland, Ohio, where his oldest brother, Reuben, who worked in banking, was then located. Reuben found Lee a job as a page in a public library. There the rebellious Hays embarked on an extensive program of self-education, becoming radicalized in the process:

Every book that was considered unfit for children to read was marked with a black rubber stamp. So I'd go through the stacks and look for these black stamps. Always the very best books. They weren't locked-up books, just books that would not normally issued to children—D. H. Lawrence, a number of European novels. Reading those books was like doors opening. Don't forget that the fundamentalist South was a closed, fixed society. The world was made in six days; everything was foreordained and fixed in the universe. ... This was the time of the Great Depression ... the whole country was in the grip of a terrible sickness, which troubled me as it did everyone else. And I didn't understand it until I started reading Upton Sinclair and the little mag[azines]. ... Somewhere along in there I became some kind of Socialist, just what kind, I have never figured out.

In 1932, Hays moved out of his brother's house into a room at the Cleveland YMCA, where he stayed for two years. Hearing about the activities of the radical white Presbyterian minister Claude C. Williams, a Christian Marxist who had become converted to the cause of racial equality and was trying to organize a coal miners' union in Paris, Arkansas, Hays decided to return to Arkansas and join Williams in his work. He enrolled at the University of the Ozarks in Clarksville, Arkansas, a Presbyterian school that allows students to work in lieu of tuition, intending to study for the ministry and devote his life to the poor and dispossessed. There he met a fellow student, Zilphia Johnson (later Zilphia Horton), another acolyte of Williams, who was to become almost as important in Hays' life as Williams himself. An accomplished musician and singer, Zilphia had broken with her father, who was the owner of the Arkansas coal mine that Williams was trying to organize, and had become a union organizer herself. Hays moved in with Williams and his family: "I got to be his [Williams'] chief helper for quite a while", he later wrote. From 1934 to 1940, writes Doris Willens, "Williams was the dominant figure in Hays' life—a surrogate father—a man of the cloth but with a radical difference". The following year, Williams was dismissed by the elders of his Paris, Arkansas, church for being too radical and was subsequently jailed, beaten, and almost killed when he tried to organize an interracial hunger march of tenant farmers in Fort Smith, Arkansas, near the Oklahoma border. His life was saved only because his activities attracted newspaper publicity and the attention of northerners. One of these was Willard Uphaus, a professor of divinity at Yale University, who had recently been appointed executive secretary of the National Religion and Labor Foundation, and who became Williams' admirer and supporter. After his release from jail, Williams moved his family away from Fort Smith to Little Rock to get them out of harm's way. Hays dropped out of school in order to follow them, living on odd jobs for a time. He then went to visit Zilphia, who had married Myles Horton, a founder and the director of the Highlander Folk School, an adult education and labor organizing school in Monteagle, Tennessee.

At Highlander, Zilphia Horton directed music, theater, and dance workshops. During a miners' union meeting in Tennessee, she recruited Hays as a song leader: "When Zilphia got up and said, 'Brother Lee Hays will now lead us in singing', I damn near dropped through the floor. There was no backing out; I had to take the plunge and I've been doing it ever since." Later, he wrote that "Claude [Williams] and Zilphia [Horton] did more to change and shape my life than any people I can recall."

In her drama classes at Highlander Zilphia borrowed the techniques of the New Theater League in New York, which encouraged participants to create plays out of their own experience, which would then be staged at labor conferences. It was a revelation for Hays to see how the arts could serve to empower people for social action. He decided to go to New York and study playwrighting himself.

Armed with a letter of introduction from Claude Williams and Willard Uphaus, Hays became a resident at a student program at New York City's progressive Judson Memorial Church. There, he and a friend, Alan Hacker, a photojournalist, raised funds to make a documentary film about the plight of Southern sharecroppers and about efforts at Highlander and elsewhere to organize the Southern Tenant Farmers Union (STFU), one of the first racially integrated labor unions in the United States. In preparation, Hays and Hacker took classes with photographer Paul Strand, among others. They shot the film in Mississippi at an experimental Quaker-run cooperative inter-racial cotton farm. Even so, they were harassed by local planters and their scripts and notebooks were stolen and had to be recreated from memory. The film, America's Disinherited, which due to limited funds was quite brief, premiered at the Judson Church in May 1937 and was shown in schools and other venues (a copy is now in the film archives of the Museum of Modern Art). It demonstrates the use of singing in building a movement: "The turning point in the film is when an image of clenched black and white hands is followed by one of biracial strikers marching and singing 'Black and white together / We shall not be moved'". Shortly after it was completed, Alan Hacker died of an illness he had contracted during the filming.

During this period Hays also wrote a play about the STFU, Gumbo (a word used by the sharecroppers for their soil), which was produced at Highlander.

== Commonwealth College ==
In 1937, when Claude Williams was appointed director of Commonwealth College in Mena Arkansas, a labor organizing school, he hired Hays to direct a theater program. The school newspaper, the Commonwealth Fortnightly, announced that:

Lee Hays, a native of Little Rock, will join Commonwealth's faculty at the beginning of the fall quarter ... to teach Workers' Dramatics and to supervise Commonwealth's drama groups.

The announcement noted that as former assistant to the drama director at Highlander Folk School and a member of the Sharecropper Film Committee which produced America's Disinherited: "Lee [Hays] brings with him to Commonwealth valuable experience and ability."

While at Commonwealth, Hays and his drama group wrote and produced numerous plays, of which one by Hays, One Bread, One Body, toured with considerable success. He also compiled a 20-page songbook of union organizing songs based on hymns and spirituals. Playwright and fellow student Eli Jaffe said that Hays "was deeply religious and extremely creative and imaginative and firmly believed in the Brotherhood of Man." Waldemar Hille, who was the dean of music at Elmhurst College near Chicago and who had spent Christmas of 1937 at Commonwealth, thought that Hays was the most talented person at the college and was particularly enchanted with the folk songs and singing he encountered there. By the next year, however, another observer noted that the "brilliant" and hitherto energetic Hays appeared "disheveled" and was "sick all the time". Doris Willens, his biographer, speculates that Hays's physical and mental states were possibly a response to the ongoing tribulations of his mentor and of Commonwealth College.

Long subject to the virulent hostility of its neighbors and in dire financial straits, the embattled school was riven by internecine struggles between its more radical members and the more moderate socialists on its board. In 1940 the board expelled the avowedly Marxist Claude Williams for allegedly allowing Communist infiltration and for being excessively preoccupied with the issue of racial discrimination, and soon after, the institution was disbanded.

== The Almanacs and World War II ==
Orval [Faubus] was a grass-roots populist in his early days and worked at the Highlander school. He was in charge of the sanitary facilities, and he kept it beautiful; he even put curtains up in the windows of the two-holer we had. But what he was best at was shoveling it out, a function which had to be performed periodically. He really put his back into it. Now he's in the Arkansas State House, performing the same function.

— Lee Hays to Steve Courtney

As the clouds gathered around Commonwealth College, Hays headed north to New York, taking with him his collection of labor songs, which he planned to turn into a book. But a short stayover in Philadelphia with the poet Walter Lowenfels and his hospitable family turned into a long visit. The German-born Lowenfels, a highly cultured man and a modernist poet who was fascinated by Walt Whitman and edited a book of his poetry, became another surrogate father to Hays, influencing him deeply. (Together the two men later wrote the politically charged song "Wasn't That a Time?") Under Lowenfels' influence, Hays also began to write modernist poems, one of which was published in Poetry Magazine in 1940. He also had pieces based on Arkansas folklore published in The Nation. Publication of these pieces led to his forming a friendship with another Nation contributor, Millard Lampell.

Arriving in New York, Hays and Lampell became roommates. They were soon joined by Pete Seeger, who like Hays was also contemplating putting together an anthology of labor songs. Together the trio began to sing at left-wing functions and to call themselves the Almanac Singers. It was a somewhat fluid group that included Josh White and Sam Gary and later Sis Cunningham (a fellow Commonwealth College alumna), Woody Guthrie (with whom Hays collaborated on his 1940 debut album, Dust Bowl Ballads), and Bess Lomax Hawes, among others. The Almanac's first album, issued in May 1941, was the controversial Songs for John Doe, comprising six pacifist songs, two of them co-written by Hays and Seeger and four by Lampell. The songs attacked the peacetime draft and the big U.S. corporations which were then receiving lucrative defense contracts from the federal government while practicing racial segregation in hiring. Since at that time isolationism was associated with right-wing conservatives and business interests, the pro-business but interventionist Time Magazine lost no time in accusing the left-wing Almanacs of "scrupulously echoing" what it called "the mendacious Moscow tune" that "Franklin Roosevelt is leading an unwilling people into a J. P. Morgan war" (Time, June 16, 1941). Concurrently, in the Atlantic Monthly Carl Joachim Friedrich, a German-born but anti-Nazi professor of political science at Harvard, deemed the Almanacs treasonous and their album "a matter for the Attorney General" because it seemed to him to be subversive of military recruitment and morale. On June 22, Hitler unexpectedly broke the Hitler-Stalin non-aggression pact and attacked Russia. Three days later, Franklin Roosevelt, threatened by black labor leaders with a huge march on Washington protesting segregation in defense hiring and the army, issued Executive Order 8802 banning racial and religious discrimination in hiring by recipients of federal defense contracts. The army, however, refused to desegregate. Somewhat mollified, nevertheless, labor leaders canceled the march and ordered union members to get behind the war and to refrain from strikes; copies of the isolationist Songs for John Doe were destroyed (a month after being issued). Asked by an interviewer in 1979 about his support of the Hitler-Stalin Pact, Hays said: "I do remember that the signing of the Hitler-Stalin pact was a very hard pill to swallow. . . . To this day I don't quite follow the line of reasoning behind that one, except to give Stalin more time." According to Hays's biographer, Doris Willens:

That the pact gave Stalin more time was the story then put out; millions around the world didn't buy it [in part because of Stalin's 1939 attack on Finland] and at that point lost faith in the Soviet Union . . . (Many others had lost faith earlier, during the Moscow purge trials.) But as a disciple of Claude [Williams], Lee in 1940 held firm with those who continued to believe that America and Britain were maneuvering not to defeat Nazi Germany, or rather, not just yet, but first to turn Hitler to their desired end of destroying the Soviet Union...In short, 1940 was a bad time to say a good word for "peace." Worse, the only other voices opposing the war emanated from the extreme right, particularly America Firsters, a group suspected of harboring the hope that Hitler would eventually triumph . . . . Whatever uneasiness the Hitler-Stalin pact churned up, Lee hoped to submerge by throwing his vast energies into the service of the dynamic Congress of Industrial Organizations [(CIO)]—the challenger to the fat and lazy and bureaucratic old American Federation of Labor. A singing labor movement, that was the goal. If you got the unions singing, peace and brotherhood had to follow. It seemed so clear and simple.

The Almanacs, who now included Sis Cunningham, Woody Guthrie, Cisco Houston, and Bess Lomax Hawes, discarded their anti-war material with no regrets and continued to perform at union halls and at hootenanies. In June 1941 they embarked on a CIO tour of the United States, playing in Detroit, Chicago, and Seattle. They also issued several additional albums, including one, Dear Mr. President (recorded c. January 1942, issued in May), strongly supporting the war. Bad publicity, however, pursued them because of their reputation as former isolationists who had become pro-war "prematurely" (i.e., six months before Pearl Harbor). As key members, Pete Seeger, Cisco Houston, and Woody Guthrie joined the war effort (Seeger in the army and Guthrie and Houston in the Merchant Marine) the group disbanded. Hays was rejected from the Armed Forces because of a mild case of tuberculosis and he indeed felt sick all the time, missed performances, and developed a reputation for hypochondria. Even before this, Seeger and the other Almanacs found Hays difficult to work with and so erratic that they had asked him to leave the group.

== People's Songs ==
When the war ended, however, a group of songwriters gathered in Pete Seeger's in-laws' apartment in Greenwich Village and founded People's Songs, "organized to create, promote and distribute songs of labor and the American people". They elected Pete Seeger president and Lee Hays executive secretary. Corporate counsel was Joseph R. Brodsky. In his new position Hays found some of his old energy returning. He wrote to friends, old and new (a new one was Fred Hellerman, later of the Weavers), who he thought might be interested. He brought in his old friend Waldemar Hille to be music editor of the People's Songs Bulletin and solicited songs and stories from Zilphia Horton, who sent in her new favorite, "We Shall Overcome". In its first year every issue of the People's Songs Bulletin featured a new song by Hays. One, written with Walter Lowenfels after a disastrous accident in a coal mine contained this verse:

Do you know how the coalminers die
To bring you coal from the earth?
They die by the hundreds and they die by the thousands
And that is what your coal is worth.

Bernard Asbell, a member of People's Songs, who in 1961 wrote the best-selling book, When FDR Died, recalled:

When I think of that period I think of Pete and Lee. Lee and Pete. Lee's deep bass singing "Roll the Union On". He and Pete are the two guys who made folk music serve political purposes. .. . Lee was the one with the sense of history, who tied it all together. He was the one who brought the sharecroppers in, and the union songs based on hymns. His images inspired us... convinced us that the Left was the great continuum of the American tradition, or at least that it was part of the mainstream of the American tradition. Lee thought in terms of events, history; he saw large, and that rubbed off on the rest of us. He was the philosopher of the folk music movement. He stretched the canvas. And he was funny—and God, we needed that. There wasn't much humor around.

Although the first year of People's Songs was very successful, once again his co-workers found Hays "difficult" and indecisive. At a board meeting in late 1946, Pete Seeger proposed Hays be replaced as executive secretary with energetic young friend of his, Felix Landau, whom Pete had met during his army days in Saipan. In retrospect, Pete confessed "I think it was a mistake. Lee's perceptions were probably truer than mine."

Crushed, Hays returned to Philadelphia to stay with Walter Lowenfels and family. From there he began contributing a weekly column to the People's Songs Bulletin aiming to educate younger people about Claude Williams and the labor and civil rights struggles of the 1930s.

In 1948, People's Songs put all of its efforts into supporting the 1948 presidential campaign of Henry Wallace on the Progressive Party ticket. Not long after Wallace's decisive defeat, People's Songs went bankrupt and disbanded. A spinoff, however, People's Artists, showed somewhat more vitality.

The Thanksgiving after Wallace's defeat, People's Songs decided to put on a fundraising hootenanny that included folk dances from many lands. A group of People's Artists, comprising Seeger, Hays, Fred Hellerman, and Ronnie Gilbert, worked up a musical accompaniment to the dances, which they called (in the "One World" spirit of the Progressive movement) "Around the World". It featured an Israeli song, the Appalachian "Flop-eared mule", and "Hey-lally-lally-lo" from the Bahamas. The audience went wild. In 1949 the new quartet began appearing at leftist functions and soon they were featured on Oscar Brand's WNYC radio show as "The No Name Quartet". Four months later they settled on a name: the Weavers.

If it wasn't for the honor, I'd just as soon not have been blacklisted.

— Lee Hays

People's Artists sponsored the concert given by Paul Robeson and classical pianists Leonid Hambro and Ray Lev in Peekskill, New York, that sparked the Peekskill Riots on September 4, 1949. The Weavers were present. Hays escaped in a car with Guthrie and Seeger after a mob claiming to be anti-communist patriots attacked the cars of audience and performers after the show. Hays wrote a song, "Hold the Line", about the experience, that the Weavers recorded on Charter records with Robeson and writer Howard Fast. If I Had a Hammer", written with Pete Seeger and also recorded on the Charter label, dates from this embattled period. A few months later, in December, the Weavers began an incredibly successful run at the Village Vanguard. One fan, Gordon Jenkins, a bandleader who had had numerous hits under his belt and was a director of Decca records, returned night after night. Born in Missouri, Jenkins was especially entranced with Lee Hays' folksy stage patter, laced with colorful Ozark anecdotes. Jenkins convinced his reluctant fellow executives at Decca to record the group. Jenkins backed them up with his own lush string orchestra and huge chorus, but tactfully and with care, so as not to obscure the words and musical personalities of the groups' personnel. To everyone's surprise, the Weavers, who seemed to fit into no musical category, produced billboard hit after billboard hit, selling millions of singles. However, the Korean War had begun and the red scare was in full swing. In September 1950, Time magazine reviewed them this way:

Last week a group of four high-spirited folksters known as the Weavers had succeeded in shouting, twanging and crooning folk singing out of its cloistered corner into the commercial big time... After the war the four met in Greenwich Village get-togethers, and decided that their voices, plus Pete's banjo and recorder, and Fred's guitar, made just the right blend. Sponsored by Red-tinged People's Songs, they got enthusiastic but unremunerative backing from fellow travelers who have long claimed folk songs as their particular province.

== The Weavers and the Red Scare ==
In 1950, Pete Seeger was listed as a probable subversive in the anti-communist pamphlet Red Channels and was placed on the entertainment industry blacklist along with other members of the Weavers. Lee Hays was denounced as a member of the Communist Party during testimony to the House Committee on Un-American Activities by Harvey Matusow, a former Communist Party member (he later recanted).

Their records dropped from Decca's catalog and from radio broadcasts, and unable to perform live on television, radio, or in most music venues, the Weavers broke up in 1952. Subsequently, Hays liked to maintain that another entertainer, called Lee Hayes, spelled with an "e", was also banned from entertaining because of the similarity of his name. "Hayes couldn't get a job the whole time I was blacklisted," he claimed.

Hays spent the blacklist years rooming with the family of fellow blacklist victim Earl Robinson (composer of "The House I Live In", "Ballad for Americans", and "Joe Hill"), in a brownstone in Brooklyn Heights. He wrote reviews and short stories, one of which, "Banquet and a Half", published in Ellery Queen's Mystery Magazine and drawing on his experiences in the South in the 1930s, was the recipient of a prize and was reprinted in the U.S. and Britain. In 1953, Hays' mother, whom he had seen only once since her entry into custodial care, died. In 1955 he was subpoenaed by the House Committee on Un-American Activities: he declined to testify, pleading the Fifth Amendment. 1955 was also the year of a sold-out Weavers Carnegie Hall reunion concert. The Weavers had not lost their audience appeal—the LP of the concert (The Weavers at Carnegie Hall) issued two years later by Vanguard, was one of the three top-selling albums of the year. This led to a tour (made difficult by Hays' invalidism and anxieties), another album, and more tours, including one to Israel.

== Later life ==
If [Benedict] Arnold was successful, we would have had a set of horse-faced rulers, but that might be preferable to what we have now.

— Lee Hays, after the election of Ronald Reagan, at the Hudson River Revival in Croton Point Park, Croton, N.Y., June 1981.

In 1958, Hays began recording a series of children's albums with the Baby Sitters, a group that included a young Alan Arkin, Earl Robinson's nephew. After the great financial success of Peter, Paul and Mary's cover of "If I Had a Hammer" in the mid-1960s, Hays, whose mental and physical health had been shaky for years, lived mostly on income from royalties.

In 1967, he moved to Croton-on-Hudson, New York where he devoted himself to tending his organic vegetable garden, cooking, writing, and socializing. He wrote to a friend that in his new surroundings he had no idea how to earn new money but that, "Having a listed number with no fear of Trotskyite crank calls is a huge relief". At the insistence of his old friend Woody's son, Arlo Guthrie, however, he did appear, playing himself as a preacher at a 1960 evangelical meeting, in the film Alice's Restaurant (1969), based on Arlo's hit song of that name.

Hays, who had always been overweight, had been diagnosed in 1960 with diabetes, a condition the doctors thought he had probably suffered from for many years previously. Hays also suffered from TB. This combination of ailments led to a heart condition, and he was fitted with a pacemaker. Both his legs eventually had to be amputated. Younger friends, among them Lawrence Lazare and Jimmy Callo, helped to take care of him.

His bad health notwithstanding, Hays performed in several Weavers reunion concerts, the last of which was in November 1980 at New York City's Carnegie Hall. His last public performance with the group took place in June 1981 at the Hudson River Revival in Croton Point Park. Two months later he was dead. The documentary film The Weavers: Wasn't That a Time!, for which Hays had written the script, was released in 1982.

Near the end of his life Hays, wrote a farewell poem, "In Dead Earnest", inspired perhaps by Wobbly organizer Joe Hill's lyrical "Last Testament" but with an earthy Ozark frankness:

In Dead Earnest

If I should die before I wake,
All my bone and sinew take:
Put them in the compost pile
To decompose a little while.
Sun, rain, and worms will have their way,
Reducing me to common clay.
All that I am will feed the trees
And little fishes in the seas.
When corn and radishes you munch,
You may be having me for lunch.
Then excrete me with a grin,
Chortling, "There goes Lee again!"
'Twill be my happiest destiny
To die and live eternally.

He died on August 26, 1981, from diabetic cardiovascular disease at home in Croton, and, in accordance with his wishes, his ashes were mixed with his compost pile.

== External sources ==
- Coogan, Harold. "Lee Elhardt Hays (1914–1981)", Encyclopedia of Arkansas History and Culture.
- Courtney, Steve. "So long to Lee Hays" (Obituary). North County News, September 2–8, 1981. P. 7.
- Hays, Lee and Koppelman, Robert Steven, Editor. Sing out, warning! Sing out, Love!: The Writings of Lee Hays. Amherst, Mass., University of Massachusetts Press, 2003.
- Smithsonian Center for Folklife and Cultural Heritage: Lee Hays Collection
- Houston, Cisco. Interviewed by Lee Hays in 1961. Website.
- Stambler, Irwin, and Grelun Landon, eds. The Encyclopedia of Folk, Country and Western Music. New York: St. Martin's Press, 1983.
- [Wilson, John S.] "Singer Lee Hays, Founder of the Weavers Quartet" (Obituary). Pittsburgh Post Gazette. (New York Times News Service, August 27, 1981. p.27)
- Willens, Doris. The Lonesome Traveler: A Biography of Lee Hays. Introduction by Pete Seeger. New York: W. W. Norton & Company, Inc., 1988.
- The Weavers: Wasn't That a Time! Warner Brothers, 1982. Film.
- Lee Hays at IMDb
- Lee Hays discography at Discogs
