= Millard Lampell =

American screenwriter (1919–1997)

Millard Lampell (born Milton Lampell, January 23, 1919 – October 3, 1997) was an American movie and television screenwriter who first became publicly known as a member of the Almanac Singers in the 1940s.

== Early life and career ==
Lampell was born in Paterson, New Jersey, one of five children born to Charles S. and Bertha Lampell. He studied at West Virginia University, where he gained his first exposure to folk music. In 1940 he formed the Almanac Singers with Pete Seeger and Lee Hays, later adding Woody Guthrie. Lampell wrote songs with both Seeger and Guthrie, and adapted traditional songs into labor anthems and pro-union messages. During the period of the Hitler-Stalin pact from 1939 to 1941, the group also sang songs attacking Franklin D. Roosevelt as a warmonger and opposing Britain's war against Nazi Germany.

After the Almanac Singers disbanded in 1942, Lampell wrote the lyrics for The Lonesome Train, a ballad opera on the death of Abraham Lincoln, with music composed by Earl Robinson. He went on to a career as a scriptwriter for movies and, later, television. In the 1950s, he refused to testify before the House Un-American Activities Committee and was blacklisted. He wrote the screenplay for the marriage guidance film This Charming Couple (1950) using the pseudonym H. Partnow. Some other of his screenplays were Blind Date (1959), The Idol (1966) and Do Not Fold, Staple, Spindle or Mutilate (1967).

Notable television plays included The Adams Chronicles and the mini-series Rich Man, Poor Man (both 1976). In 1966, he was awarded an Emmy for his teleplay for the Hallmark Hall of Fame drama Eagle in a Cage. He also wrote novels, and the play The Wall which was produced on Broadway.

Lampell died of lung cancer in 1997 at the age of 78.
