= Midnight Special (Lead Belly album) =

Studio album by Lead Belly, Woody Guthrie, and Cisco Houston
- Released: 1947
- Recorded: October 1946, New York City
- Genre: Folk, blues
- Length: 13:59
- Label: Disc Records
- Producer: Moses Asch

Lead Belly chronology
Negro Folk Songs (1946)	Midnight Special (1947)

Midnight Special is an album by Lead Belly, Woody Guthrie, and Cisco Houston, recorded in 1946 and released as an album in 1947.

In October 1946, Lead Belly, Woody Guthrie, and Cisco Houston went into the studio to record for producer Moe Asch. They recorded eight tracks, six of which were released to the public. Initially those tracks were released as singles, but eventually they were collected into a three-disc 10" 78 rpm album, Midnight Special (catalog number, Disc 726). Ultimately, this would be the last album Lead Belly would release while he was still alive.

== Track listing ==
No.	Title	Matrix Number	Length
1.	"Midnight Special"	D-674	2:17
2.	"Ham & Eggs"	D-670	2:49
3.	"Grey Goose"	D-673	1:37
4.	"Yellow Gal"	D-671	2:26
5.	"Alabama Bound"	D-669	2:20
6.	"Stewball"	D-672	2:30
