= Ronald Clyne =

American artist (1925–2006)

- Born: Ronald Clyne; December 28, 1925; Chicago, Illinois, U.S.
- Died: 2006
- Occupations: designer, graphic artist
- Years active: 1945–2006

Ronald Clyne (1925–2006) was an American designer and graphic artist. He is best known for creating over 500 covers for Folkways Records between 1948 and 1986.

== Early career ==
After beginning to draw at the age of 8, Clyne sold his first drawing at the age of 15 to Ray Palmer of Fantastic Adventures and Amazing Stories. It was published in the November 1941 issue of Fantastic Adventures. This led him to doing cover art for several fanzines of the era, such as Bob Tucker’s Le Zombie, and Al Ashley’s Nova. A few years later, he would do work for Fan Slants, Famous Fantastic Mysteries and Fanvariety and a great number of other fantasy and horror books and magazines - prominent amongst them being “The Arkham Sampler”.

Clyne's first published book jacket illustration was for August Derleth's Something Near in 1945. He also provided the art for Jack Snow's collection Dark Music and Other Spectral Tales (1947). This jacket originally had Ray Bradbury's name printed on the lower panel beneath the art, as Bradbury was to have provided a foreword, but after Bradbury reneged (due to the publisher insisting on including material by Snow which was juvenilia that Bradbury considered "patently unpublishable"), a bar of ink was printed over Bradbury's name on all the jackets, which had already been printed.

Clyne designed a number book jackets for August Derleth's Arkham House during the first two decades of that publisher's history.

== Folkways designs ==
In the early years of Folkways Records (1948), founder Moses Asch felt that the cover designs should marry with the recorded sound, and they differed from those of other commercial record labels. They use only two-colour printing on matt paper glued over a thick matt black cardboard sleeve - always leaving a thin black line around the cover’s edge. Clyne’s singular use of typography, layout and image was to be most often used and he was inspired by portrait photos given to him by Asch, and images that he would source during regular visits to the New York Public Library and National Archive. Clyne has been quoted as saying "A record cover should be seen at a glance. You shouldn’t have to study different sections of it. You should see the total instantly."

In 2007 a retrospective exhibition of Clyne's work was mounted at The Narrows in Melbourne, Australia.

== Collections ==
Clyne's work is included in the permanent collection of the Museum of Modern Art, New York.

== Selected Folkways covers ==
- Ella Jenkins - Seasons For Singing
- Pete Seeger & Sonny Terry at Carnegie Hall
- Memphis Slim - Memphis Slim
- Woody Guthrie - Sings Folk Songs
- Louise Bennett - Jamaican Folk Songs
- Dave Van Ronk - Ballads, Blues and a Spiritual
- Cisco Houston - Cisco Houston Sings Songs of the Open Road
- Raimon - Catalonian Protest songs
- The Roots of Lightnin' Hopkins
- Black Drama
