= Leadbelly Sings Folk Songs =

Compilation album by Leadbelly
- Released: 1989
- Recorded: 1940s
- Genre: Folk
- Length: 32:01
- Label: Folkways Records

Professional ratings
Review scores
Source	Rating
AllMusic	4.5/5 stars
The Encyclopedia of Popular Music	3/5 stars
The Penguin Guide to Blues Recordings	3/4 stars
The Rolling Stone Album Guide	3/5 stars

Leadbelly Sings Folk Songs is a remastered compilation album of American folk songs sung by legend Leadbelly accompanied by Woody Guthrie, Cisco Houston, and Sonny Terry, originally recorded by Moses Asch in the 1940s and re-released in 1989 by Folkways Records. Originally released on Folkways Records (FA 2488) in 1962 as "Leadbelly Sings Folks Songs With Woody Guthrie, Cisco Houston, Sonny Terry and Brownie McGhee.".

== Critical reception ==
The Penguin Guide to Blues Recordings called it a "good LP," but one that has been superseded by superior reissues.

== Track listing ==
All tracks are written by Huddie Ledbetter.

No.	Title	Length
1.	"There's a Man Going Around Taking Names"	1:24
2.	"Stewball"	2:27
3.	"Keep Your Hands Off Her"	2:51
4.	"Good, Good, Good (Talking, Preaching)/We Shall Walk Thru the Valley"	2:11
5.	"Linin' Track"	1:11
6.	"Outskirts of Town"	2:39
7.	"We Shall Be Free"	2:33
8.	"Ain't You Glad (Blood Done Signed My Name)"	2:19
9.	"On a Monday"	1:47
10.	"Jean Harlow"	1:39
11.	"Corn Bread Rough"	2:06
12.	"National Defense Blues"	3:00
13.	"Little Children's Blues"	2:27
14.	"Fiddler's Dram"	2:28
15.	"Meeting At the Building"	0:59
Total length:		32:01

All track information and credits were taken from the CD liner notes.
