= Play Parties in Song and Dance =

Studio album by Lead Belly
- Released: 1941
- Recorded: May and July 1941, New York City
- Genre: Folk; blues
- Length: 14:54
- Label: Asch Recordings
- Producer: Moses Asch

Lead Belly chronology
The Midnight Special and Other Southern Prison Songs (1940)	Play Parties in Song and Dance (1941)	Work Songs of the U.S.A. (1942)

Play Parties in Song and Dance (or Play Parties in Song and Dance as Sung by Lead Belly) is an album by Lead Belly recorded in 1941 and released a few months later by Asch Recordings.

In 1941, Lead Belly was introduced to Moses "Moe" Asch by mutual friends. Asch ran a small record label, mainly releasing folk records for the local New York City market. Lead Belly's initial recording sessions for Asch were held in May and July 1941 at the Asch Recording Studios, located on West 46th Street in New York City. He recorded a total of eight songs, six of which were released. The three-disc 78 rpm album was released around October 1941 and each copy was sold for $2.50. According to royalty statements from Asch, the album had sold 492 copies by the end of April 1942. Lead Belly received $29.52 in royalties at the rate of six cents an album, or two cents an individual record. Charles Wolfe and Kip Lornell notes that this rate was "in line for that . . . time."

== Track listing ==
No.	Title	Matrix Number	Length
1.	"Ha-Ha This Way"	SC-26	1:37
2.	"Sally Walker"	SC-27	2:42
3.	"Christmas Song"	SC-34-X	2:44
4.	"Redbird"	SC-32	2:57
5.	"Skip to My Lou"	SC-79	2:14
6.	"You Can't Lose Me, Cholly"	SC-80	2:40
