= Songs by Lead Belly =

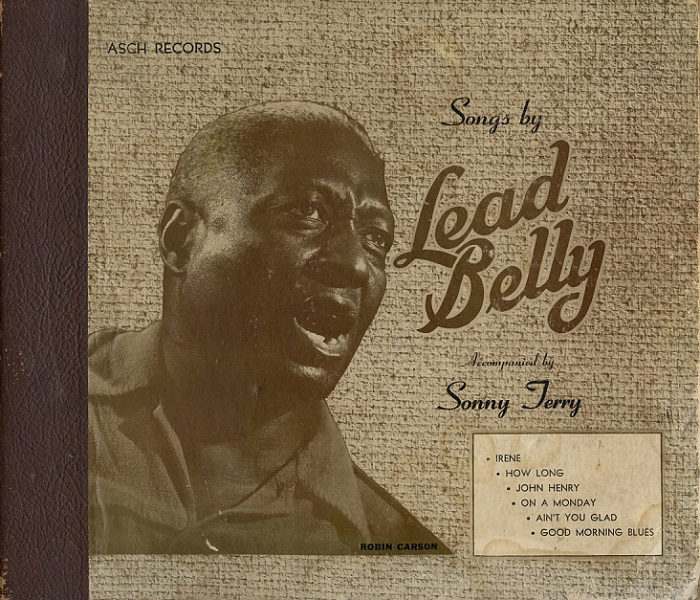

Studio album by Lead Belly
- Released: 1944
- Recorded: August 1943, New York City
- Genre: Folk; blues
- Length: 13:28
- Label: Asch Recordings
- Producer: Moses Asch

Lead Belly chronology
Work Songs of the U.S.A. (1942)	Songs by Lead Belly (1944)	Negro Folk Songs (1946)

Songs by Lead Belly is an album by Lead Belly, recorded in 1943 by Asch Recordings and probably released in 1944.

At this point in Lead Belly's career he had split with John Lomax and was mainly recording with Moe Asch. In August 1943, Lead Belly recorded six songs for Asch. These songs were likely released as singles before being compiled into an album. In April 1944, Asch stated that Lead Belly was paid $250 for a special run of 10,000 copies of "How Long Blues," a cover of Leroy Carr's 1928 song. Meanwhile, the New York Times reports that in June 1944, Songs by Lead Belly was issued as a new album. Songs by Lead Belly (catalog number: Asch A-343) was Lead Belly's third album for Moe Asch. It was released as a three-disc collection of 10" 78 rpm records, with notes prepared by Charles Edward Smith.

== Track listing ==
No.	Title	Matrix Number	Length
1.	"Good Morning Blues"	SC-263	2:26
2.	"How Long"	SC-260	2:16
3.	"Ain't You Glad"	SC-262	2:05
4.	"Irene"	SC-261-1	2:25
5.	"On a Monday"	SC-258	1:49
6.	"John Henry"	SC-259	2:27
