= Cisco Houston Sings Songs of the Open Road =

Studio album by Cisco Houston
- Released: 1960
- Genres: Folk; Blues; Country blues
- Length: 32:57
- Label: Folkways
- Producer: Moses Asch

Cisco Houston chronology
The Cisco Special! (1959)	Cisco Houston Sings Songs of the Open Road (1960)	Cisco Houston Sings the Songs of Woody Guthrie (1960)

Cisco Houston Sings Songs of the Open Road is a studio album by American folk singer Cisco Houston. It was released in 1960 by Folkways Records. In the liner notes, Cisco Houston writes that he's been from coast to coast at least thirty times and has traveled a "good part" of the world as well. This album presents thirteen songs about the tribulations and joys of life on the road. The album cover was designed by Ronald Clyne.

Professional ratings
Review scores
Source	Rating
AllMusic	4.5/5 stars

== Track listing ==
No.	Title	Length
1.	"Muleskinner Blues"	6:41
2.	"Whoopie Ti-Yi-Yo, Get Along Little Dogies"	2:03
3.	"Erie Canal"	1:52
4.	"Hobo's Lullaby"	1:58
5.	"East Virginia"	1:43
6.	"Done Laid Around"	1:42
7.	"The Preacher and the Slave (Pie in the Sky)"	3:11
8.	"The Job I Left Behind Me"	1:13
9.	"Soup Song"	1:40
10.	"Beans, Bacon and Gravy"	2:26
11.	"The Tramp"	3:17
12.	"Cryderville Jail"	3:21
13.	"I Ain't Got No Home in This World Anymore"	1:50
Total length:		32:57
