= Lead Belly Sings for Children =

Compilation album by Lead Belly
- Released: March 23, 1999
- Genre: Folk; Blues
- Length: 1:00:38
- Label: Smithsonian Folkways
- Producer: Jeff Place, Anthony Seeger

Lead Belly Sings for Children is a compilation album by American folk and blues singer Lead Belly. It was released in 1999 by Smithsonian Folkways.

This collection features songs for young children as well as the work songs, blues, and spirituals Lead Belly used to teach children about the experiences and emotions of adult life. Originally recorded in children's concerts and studios for Moses Asch and Folkways Records in the 1940s.

A dozen of these 28 songs were first issued on the 1960 Folkways album Negro Folk Songs for Young People. The additional tracks were recorded by Moses Asch of Folkways Records from 1941 to 1948, and include five of the six songs released on the 1941 album Party Songs/Sings & Plays. This compilation also includes a previously unreleased radio broadcast of "Take This Hammer".

Professional ratings
Review scores
Source	Rating
AllMusic	4.5/5 stars
The Penguin Guide to Blues Recordings	3/4 stars

== Track listing ==
No.	Title	Length
1.	"More Yet"	1:05
2.	"Boll Weevil"	3:42
3.	"Little Boy, How Old Are You?"	0:58
4.	"Skip to My Lou"	2:14
5.	"Red Bird"	2:57
6.	"Sally Walker"	2:42
7.	"Ha Ha This A-Way"	1:37
8.	"Grey Goose"	1:27
9.	"Christmas is A-Coming (Chicken Crows at Midnight)"	1:07
10.	"The Blue Tailed Fly (Jimmie Crack Corn)"	2:20
11.	"Polly Wee (The Frog Song)"	1:15
12.	"Pig Latin Song"	1:38
13.	"When a Man's a Long Way from Home"	2:59
14.	"Good Morning Blues"	2:14
15.	"By and By When the Morning Comes"	1:57
16.	"Every Time I Feel the Spirit / Swing Low, Sweet Chariot / They Hung Him on the Cross (medley)"	3:25
17.	"Swing Low, Sweet Chariot"	1:05
18.	"Rock Island Line"	1:35
19.	"Cotton Fields"	2:09
20.	"Old Man"	2:38
21.	"John Henry"	4:03
22.	"Julie Ann Johnson"	2:55
23.	"Whoa Back Buck"	2:12
24.	"You Can't Lose Me Cholly"	2:40
25.	"Midnight Special"	2:05
26.	"Pick a Bale of Cotton"	1:33
27.	"Take This Hammer"	2:54
28.	"We're in the Same Boat, Brother"	2:37
