= The Midnight Special and Other Southern Prison Songs =

Studio album by Lead Belly and the Golden Gate Quartet
- Released: 1940
- Recorded: June 15 and 17, 1940, New York City
- Genre: Folk; blues
- Length: 18:08
- Label: Victor Records
- Producer: Robert P. Weatherald

Lead Belly chronology
| Negro Sinful Songs (1939) | The Midnight Special and Other Southern Prison Songs (1940) | Play Parties in Song and Dance (1941) |

The Midnight Special and Other Southern Prison Songs is an album by Lead Belly and the Golden Gate Quartet, recorded for Victor Records in 1940 and released a few months later.

In 1939, Lead Belly was back in jail for assault after stabbing a man in a fight in Manhattan. The ethnomusicologist Alan Lomax, who had started to make field recordings of folk music for the Library of Congress, helped raise money for Lead Belly's legal expenses. It was Lomax's original intent to record songs in prison, but instead a recording studio was used. To create a "prison" feel Lomax suggested that the Golden Gate Quartet back Lead Belly. However, the Golden Gate Quartet was a polished, professional group, and Lead Belly had to teach them how to sing as a group of prisoners would sing the selected songs.

The album was issued with extensive notes and song texts prepared by Alan Lomax. According to Charles Wolfe and Kip Lornell, "it was one of the finest public presentations of Leadbelly's music: well recorded, well advertised, well documented. And the album justified its reputation as a landmark in African American folk music."

The Midnight Special and Other Southern Prison Songs was originally released a three-disc collection of 78 rpm records, catalog number Victor P-50. All tracks were recorded at Victor Studios in New York City on June 15 and 17, 1940.

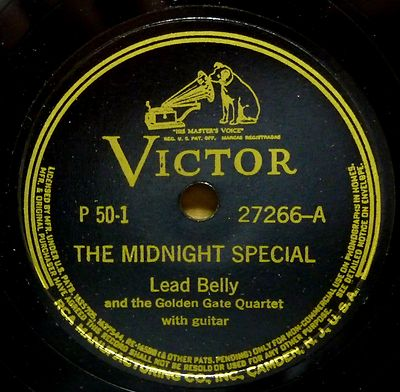
An image of the original 78 record from Lead Belly's Victor album.

== Track listing ==
| No. | Title | Matrix Number | Length |
|---|---|---|---|
| 1. | "The Midnight Special" | 051298-1 | 3:07 |
| 2. | "Ham an' Eggs" | 051333-1 | 2:59 |
| 3. | "Grey Goose" | 051327-2 | 2:57 |
| 4. | "Stewball" | 051329-1 | 3:01 |
| 5. | "Pick a Bale of Cotton" | 051295-1 | 3:01 |
| 6. | "Alabama Bound" | 051299-1 | 3:03 |
