= Work Songs of the U.S.A. =

Studio album by Lead Belly
- Released: 1942
- Recorded: January 1942, New York City
- Genre: Folk; blues
- Length: 13:57
- Label: Asch Recordings
- Producer: Moses Asch

Lead Belly chronology
Play Parties in Song and Dance (1941)	Work Songs of the U.S.A. (1942)	Songs by Lead Belly (1944)

Work Songs of the U.S.A. (or Work Songs of the U.S.A. Sung by Lead Belly) is an album by Lead Belly, recorded in 1942 and released a few months later by Asch Recordings.

At this point in Lead Belly's career he had split with John Lomax and was mainly recording with Moe Asch. In January 1942, Lead Belly recorded six tracks for Asch, all of which made it on to the album. Work Songs of the U.S.A. was released a three-disc collection of 78 rpm records in the spring of 1942. Although the sales of this album were disappointing (only resulting in 304 copies sold by March 1943), some of Lead Belly's best remembered songs debuted here, such as "Take This Hammer" and "Rock Island Line." A contemporary review in Jazz magazine was highly favorable, calling the record "superbly done."

== Track listing ==
No.	Title	Matrix Number	Length
1.	"Take This Hammer"	SC-101	2:17
2.	"Corn Bread Rough"	SC-105	2:08
3.	"Ol' Riley"	SC-104	2:33
4.	"Rock Island Line"	SC-103	2:05
5.	"Haul Away Joe"	SC-102	2:16
6.	"Old Man"	SC-106-1	2:38
