= Negro Folk Songs =

Studio album by Lead Belly
- Released: 1946
- Recorded: October 1943, New York City
- Genre: Folk, blues
- Length: 22:04
- Label: Disc Records
- Producer: Moses Asch

Lead Belly chronology
Songs by Lead Belly (1944)	Negro Folk Songs (1946)	Midnight Special (1947)

Negro Folk Songs (or Negroe Folksongs Sung by Lead Belly) is an album by Lead Belly, recorded in 1943 and released as an album in early 1946.

By 1943, Lead Belly had recorded and released two albums and several singles with producer Moe Asch and his label Asch Recordings. In October of this year, Lead Belly went into the studio and recorded six more sides for Asch. These songs were intended to be released as an album under Asch Recordings, but it is unlikely this was ever issued. In 1945, Asch Recordings went out of business and Moe Asch partnered with Herbert Harris to form Disc Records. By the fall of 1945, Disc Records would entirely replace Asch Recordings, owning all its previously recorded material. Asch would reissue several of Lead Belly's records on this new label. These songs that were recorded years earlier may have been issued for the first time as Negro Folk Songs (catalog number Disc 660), a three-disc collection of 12" 78 rpm records. The linear notes were written by Fred Ramsey. In July 1946, Studs Terkel (a Chicago disc jockey) wrote a fan letter to Asch, telling him he had received positive responses to this album, as well as other albums released by Disc Records.

Multiple short songs were recorded as one continuous take and therefore have the same matrix number. Each matrix number was given its own side of a record.

In 1994, Document Records released digital remasters of these songs on the album Leadbelly: Complete Recorded Works 1939–1947 in Chronological Order, Volume 3: October 1943 to 25 April 1944, catalog number DOCD-5228. On this remaster, each of the matrix numbers were given their own track. The six tracks are meant to represent the six sides of the album.

== Track listing ==
Disc one
No.	Title	Matrix Number	Length
1.	"Bring Me Lil Water Silvy"	SC-275	0:51
2.	"Julie Ann Johnson"	SC-275	0:41
3.	"Line 'Em"	SC-275	0:58
4.	"Whoa, Back, Buck!"	SC-275	1:26
5.	"Meeting at the Building"	SC-273	1:02
6.	"Talking, Preaching"	SC-273	0:58
7.	"We Shall Walk through the Valley"	SC-273	1:22

Disc two
No.	Title	Matrix Number	Length
1.	"Fiddler's Dram"	SC-274	0:55
2.	"Yellow Girl"	SC-274	0:54
3.	"Green Corn"	SC-274	1:23
4.	"Cow Cow Yicky Yicky Yea"	SC-270	1:33
5.	"Out on the Western Plains"	SC-270	1:38

Disc three
No.	Title	Matrix Number	Length
1.	"John Hardy"	SC-272	4:18
2.	"Noted Rider"	SC-271	1:29
3.	"Big Fat Woman"	SC-271	1:20
4.	"Borrow Love and Go"	SC-271	1:16
