= Gandy dancer =

Slang term for workers on railroad tracks

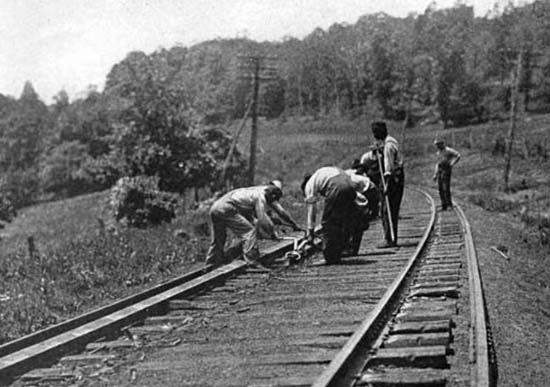
A railroad section gang – including common workers sometimes called gandy dancers – responsible for maintenance of a particular section of railway. One man is holding a bar, while others are using rail tongs to position a rail. Photo published in 1917.

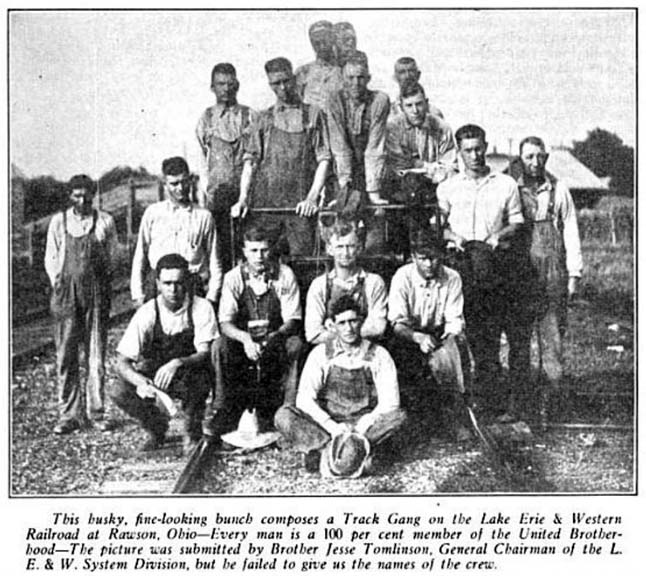
Photo of railroad maintenance section crew, Lake Erie & Western Railroad, Rawson, Ohio, 1920

Gandy dancer is a slang term used for early railroad workers in the United States and Canada, more formally referred to as section hands, who laid and maintained railroad tracks in the years before the work was done by machines. The British equivalents of the term gandy dancer are navvy (from navigator)—originally, builders of canals, or inland navigations—for builders of railway lines, and platelayer for workers employed to inspect and maintain the track. In the Southwestern United States and Mexico, Mexican and Mexican-American track workers were colloquially traqueros.

In the United States and Canada, early section crews were often made up of recent immigrants and ethnic minorities who vied for steady work despite poor wages and working conditions, and hard physical labor. The Chinese, Mexican Americans, and Native Americans in the Western United States, the Irish in the Midwestern United States, African Americans in the Southern United States, and East Europeans and Italians in the Northeastern United States all worked as gandy dancers.

There are various theories about the derivation of the term, but most refer to the "dancing" movements of the workers using a specially manufactured five-foot (1.5 m) "lining" bar, which came to be called a "gandy", as a lever to keep the tracks in alignment.

== Etymology ==
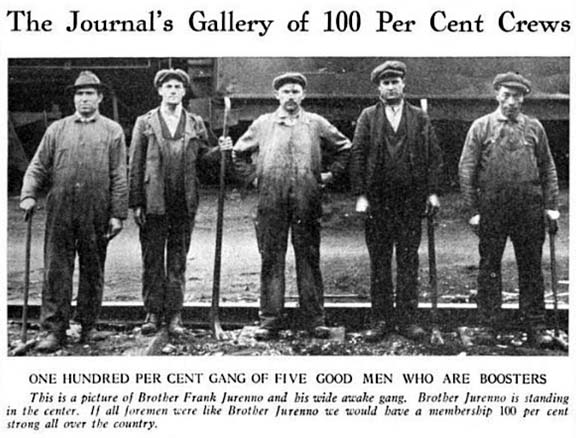
A "wide awake gang" of section crew workers. Photo shows what appear to be heel claw bars used to pull up spikes. The title and caption of the photo refer to union membership. Published in Brotherhood of Maintenance of Way Employees Journal, 1921.

The term has an uncertain origin. A majority of early northern railway workers were Irish, so an Irish or Gaelic derivation for the English term seems possible.

Others have suggested that the term gandy dancer was coined to describe the movements of the workers themselves, i.e., the constant "dancing" motion of the track workers as they lunged against their tools in unison to nudge the rails, often timed by a chant; as they carried rails; or, speculatively, as they waddled like ganders while running on the railroad ties.

Researchers have identified a "Gandy Shovel Company" or, variously, "Gandy Manufacturing Company" or "Gandy Tool Company" reputed to have existed in Chicago as the source of the tools from which gandy dancers took their name. Some sources even list the goods manufactured by the company, i.e., "tamping bars, claw bars, picks, and shovels." But others have cast doubt on the existence of such a company. The Chicago Historical Society has been asked for information on the company so many times that they have said, "It's like a legend," but they have never been able to find a Gandy company in their old records.

== History ==
"Typical Stone Ballasted Track", photo published in 1921

Though rail tracks were held in place by wooden ties (sleepers outside the U.S. and Canada) and the mass of the crushed rock (ballast) beneath them, each pass of a train around a curve, through centripetal force and vibration, produces a tiny shift in the tracks, requiring that work crews periodically realign the track. If allowed to accumulate, such shifts could eventually cause a derailment.

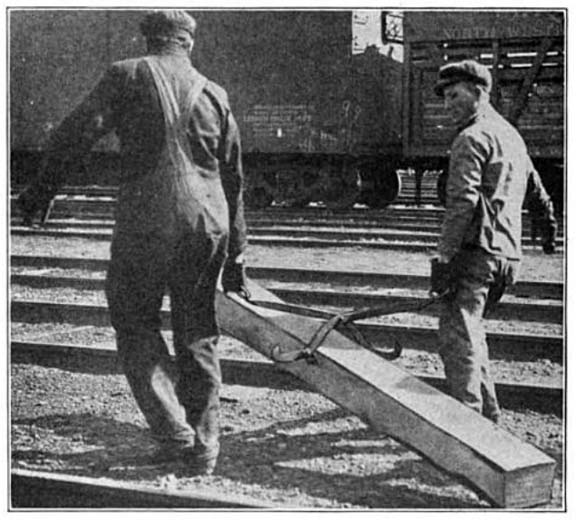
Railway workers move a cross tie using tie tongs. Photo published in 1916.

For each stroke, a worker would lift his lining bar (gandy) and force it into the ballast to create a fulcrum, then throw himself forward using the bar to check his full weight (making the "huh" sound recorded in the lyrics below) so the bar would push the rail toward the inside of the curve.

The process is explained at the Encyclopedia Alabama folklore section:

"Each workman carried a lining bar, a straight pry bar with a sharp end. The thicker bottom end was square-shafted (to fit against the rail) and shaped to a chisel point (to dig down into the gravel underneath the rail); the lighter top end was rounded (for better gripping). When lining track, each man would face one of the rails and work the chisel end of his lining bar down at an angle into the ballast under it. Then all would take a step toward their rail and pull up and forward on their pry bars to lever the track—rails, crossties and all—over and through the ballast."

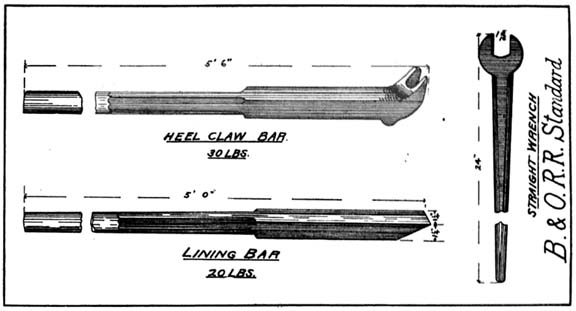
Sketch of standard section crew tools from the B & O Railroad, published in Maintenance of way standards on American railways, 1896. Above is a heel claw bar, below is a lining bar, and to the right is a straight wrench.

Workers also needed to periodically level the track by jacking it up in the low spots. Standing shoulder to shoulder, they raised the track with square-ended picks and pushed ballast under the railroad ties. Even with repeated impacts from the work crew of eight, ten, or more, any progress made in shifting the track would not become visible until after a large number of repetitions.

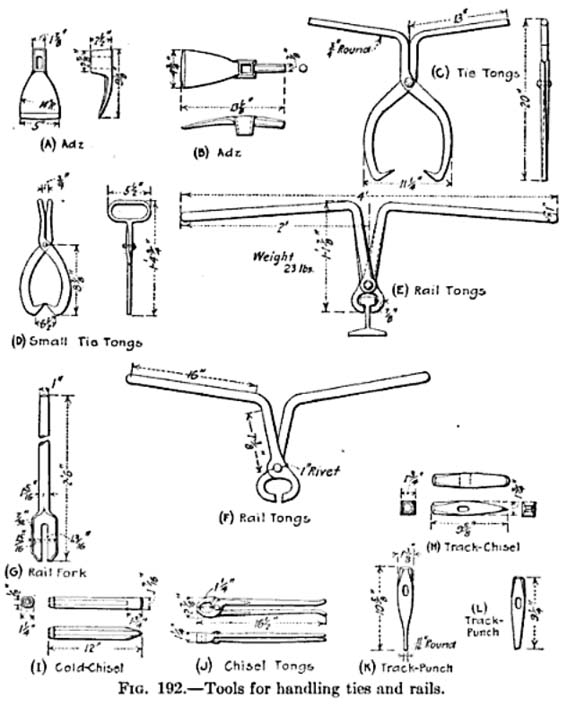
Tools for handling railroad cross ties and rails, including rail tongs (sometimes called "rail dogs"). Sketch published in 1915.

As maintenance of way workers, besides lining bars gandy dancers also used special sledge hammers called spike mauls to drive spikes, shovels or ballast forks to move track ballast, large clamps called "rail dogs" to carry rails, and ballast tamper bars or picks to adjust the ballast. The same ground crews also performed the other aspects of track maintenance, such as removing weeds, unloading ties and rails, and replacing worn rails and rotten ties. The work was extremely difficult and the pay was low, but it was one of the only jobs available for southern black men and newly arriving immigrants at that time. Black men working on the railroad were held in high esteem among their peers. There's a blues song that says "when you marry, marry a railroad man, every day Sunday, a dollar in your hand."

=== Early economic circumstance of maintenance of way employees ===
In 1918, in an article for Harper's Magazine about the Industrial Workers of the World (IWW), Robert W. Bruere explained the economic circumstances that sometimes drove gandy dancers and other itinerant workers to join that organization:

The division superintendent of a great Western railroad recently explained to me his reluctant part in the creation of the socially disintegrating conditions out of which the migratory workers and the rebellious propaganda of the I. W. W. have sprung. "The men down East," he said, "the men who have invested their money in our road, measure our administrative efficiency by money return—by net earnings and dividends. Many of our shareholders have never seen the country our road was built to serve; they get their impression of it and of its people, not from living contact with men, but from the impersonal ticker. They judge us by quotations and the balance-sheet. The upshot is that we have to keep expenses cut close as a jailbird's hair. Take such a detail as the maintenance of ways, for example—the upkeep of tracks and road-beds. This work should be going on during the greater part of the year. But to keep costs down, we have crowded it into four months. It is impossible to get the number and quality of men we need by the offer of a four months' job. So we publish advertisements broadcast that read something like this:

Men Wanted! High Wages!
Permanent Employment!

"We know when we put our money into these advertisements that they are— well, part of a pernicious system of sabotage. We know that we are not going to give permanent employment. But we lure men with false promises, and they come. At the end of four months we lay them off, strangers in a strange country, many of them thousands of miles from their old homes. We wash our hands of them. They come with golden dreams, expecting in many cases to build homes, rear families, become substantial American citizens. After a few weeks, their savings gone, the single men grow restless and start moving; a few weeks more and the married men bid their families good-by. They take to the road hunting for jobs, planning to send for their families when they find steady work. Some of them swing onto the freight-trains and beat their way to the nearest town, are broke when they get there, find the labor market oversupplied, and, as likely as not, are thrown into jail as vagrants. Some of them hit the trail for the woods, the ranches, and the mines. Many of them never find a stable anchorage again; they become hobos, vagabonds, wayfarers—migratory and intermittent workers, outcasts from society and the industrial machine, ripe for the denationalized fellowship of the I. W. W." Bruere concluded, "[t]his is a small but characteristic example of a vast system of human exploitation that has been developed by the powerful suction of our headlong industrial expansion..."

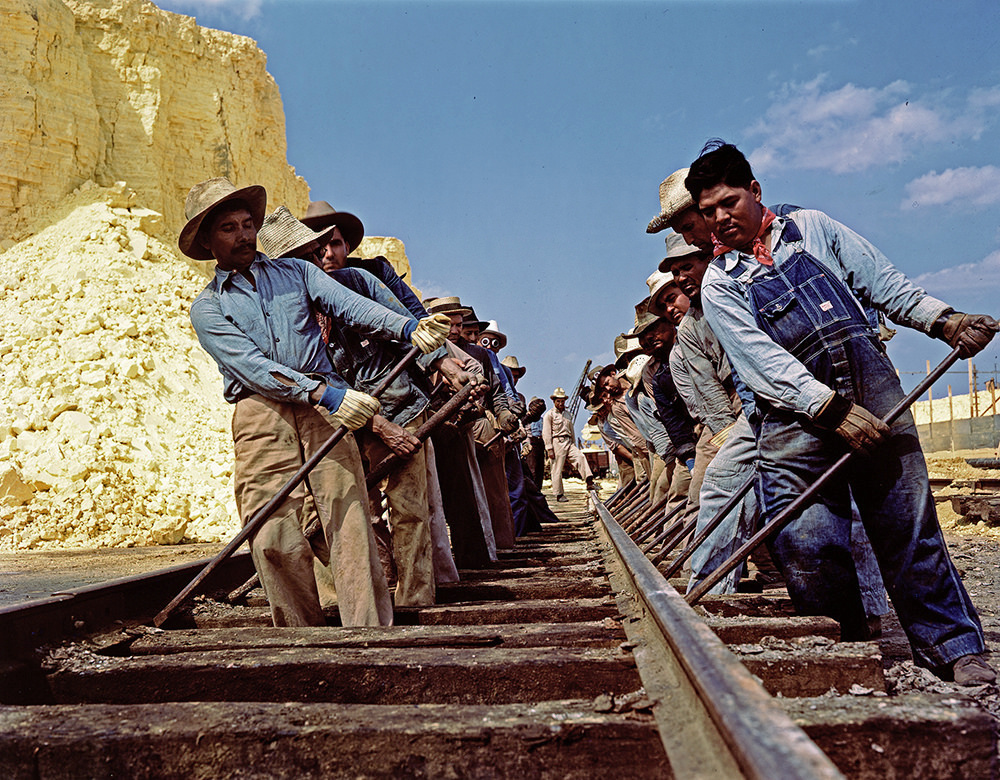
Workers adjusting railroad tracks, Louisiana, ca. 1939

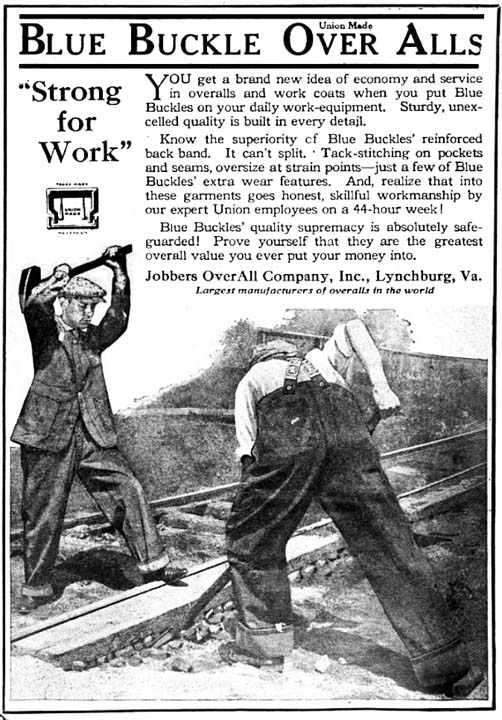
Railway workers in historical advertisement for Blue Buckle Over Alls, published in Brotherhood of Maintenance of Way Employees Journal, 1920

Black historian and journalist Thomas Fleming began his career as a bellhop and then spent five years as a cook for the Southern Pacific Railroad. In a weekly series of articles he wrote of his memories of the Mexican section hands in the 1920s and 30s. He recalled that the Southern Pacific gave them a place to sleep: old boxcars converted into two-room cabins. The company would take old boxcars, remove the wheels, and lay them alongside the tracks. He remembers that the workers had a lot of children who attended the public schools, but the ones he met during his childhood were "kind of meek, and took a lot of abuse from the other kids". Fleming says that "you found them right outside of all towns in California; that was part of the landscape." He suggests that they may have been the only ones who were willing to do the job because they got the lowest pay of any railroad workers, only about $40 a month.

During the early 1940s when the U.S. was involved in the fighting of World War II, the days of Rosie the Riveter, a few women worked as gandy dancers. During the war years so many of the men were away that the U.S. developed a severe labor shortage and women stepped in to do what, to that time, had been done exclusively by men. A 1988 article in The Valley Gazette carried the story of several local women who had worked on the Reading Railroad in Tamaqua, Pennsylvania as gandy dancers. In an interview one of the women, Mary Gbur, said that it was the money, about $55 a week, that had attracted her to the job: “Money was short and I wanted to help my children continue their education after high school. And the railroad beat the $18 a week the dime store paid.” Gbur called the work "gruesome and boring" and apparently it was seen by the townspeople as degrading for a woman to be doing manual labor, leaving the women feeling embarrassed about the work they were doing. However, she said, "One day attitudes changed when a voice boomed out, 'I am sure proud of you ladies!'" The voice was that of the village priest.

=== Early use of term ===
Michael Quinion identified the first known (printed) use of the term gandy dancer as 1918, but with so little understanding of the origin of the term it is impossible to know when it came into being. An article in the May 1918 edition of the weekly publication The Outlook (New York) asks the question:

What is a "gandy dancer"? The words were on a blackboard outside a store on the Bowery. In old times they might have suggested the proximity of a cheap dance house. But the Bowery has changed. Within the space of a few blocks there are now more than a score of "labor bureaus" where formerly were low dives and "suicide halls". Inquiry of an Italian employee of the bureau elicited the information that a "gandy dancer" is a railway worker who tamps down the earth between the ties, or otherwise "dances" on the track. The announcement read:

Men wanted for track work cinder ballast no rock straight time rain or shine paid weekly accommodation very good. Board furnished $5 per week. It is a good job particularly for veteran gandy dancers. It's a few miles out and requires no weeks toil to get back to this burg.

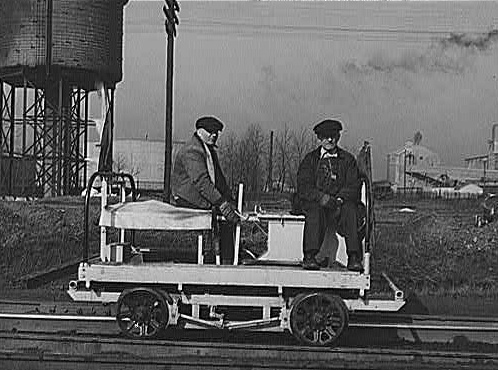
Members of a section crew riding a hand car at an Indiana Harbor Belt Line railroad yard, 1943

A story published in the August 1931 edition of Boys' Life, a monthly magazine of the Boy Scouts of America for boys 6 to 18, mentions the term "gandy". In the story, "Eddie Parker", about 17 or 18 years old and characterized as the all-American type, takes on a job as a worker in a railway section crew. His new co-workers are all Italian immigrants, or, as referred to in the story, "snipes". The "snipes" are characterized as lazy, stupid, and lovers of garlic, olive oil, and Italian music. "Eddie" figures a way to get the Italians to work at pumping the hand car – used to get to and from the section the crew would be working on that day – by using their love of music. He explains that he "hooked a grind organ onto the under frame and attached the handle to the axle crank..,[and] whenever the axel turns the handle has to follow it." Throughout the story, the workers are referred to as section crew workers, but the hand-car is referred to as a "gandy".

In the 1960s Maintenance of Way laborers were still being called "gandy dancers" by track foremen in Oregon, and the tamping rod was called a "gandy pole" by most or simply a "gandy".

== Songs and chants ==
While most southern railroad maintenance workers were African American, gandy dancers were not strictly southern or African American. Section crews were often made up of recent immigrants and ethnic minorities who vied for steady work despite poor wages and working conditions, and hard physical labor. The Chinese, Mexican Americans, and Native Americans in the West, the Irish in the Midwest, and East Europeans and Italians in the Northeast laid and maintained track as well. Though all gandy dancers sang railroad songs, it may be that black gandy dancers, with a long tradition of using song to coordinate work, were unique in their use of task-related work chants.

Rhythm was necessary both to synchronize the manual labor, and to maintain the morale of workers. Work songs and hollers sung in a call-and-response format were used to coordinate the various aspects of all rail maintenance; slower speech-like "dogging" calls to direct the picking up and manipulating of the steel rails and unloading, hauling and stacking of the ties, and more rhythmic songs for spiking and lining (aligning) the rails and tamping the bed of ballast beneath them.

In 1939 John Lomax recorded a number of railroad songs which contain an example of an "unloading steel rails" call.

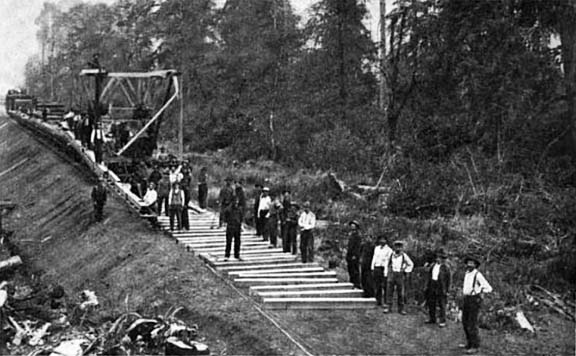
Laying railroad track "in the woods". Photo published in Railway and locomotive engineering: a practical journal of motive power, rolling stock and appliances, Volume 15, 1902.

There is no doubt that country singer Jimmie Rodgers was influenced by the working songs of the gandy dancers. His father, a section foreman in Meridian, Mississippi, brought his son with him to work as a water boy where he would have been exposed to their musical chants. Rodgers went on to be known as the "Singing Brakeman" and the Father of Country Music.

Anne Kimzey of the Alabama Center For Traditional Culture writes: "All-black gandy dancer crews used songs and chants as tools to help accomplish specific tasks and to send coded messages to each other so as not to be understood by the foreman and others. The lead singer, or caller, would chant to his crew, for example, to realign a rail to a certain position. His purpose was to uplift his crew, both physically and emotionally, while seeing to the coordination of the work at hand. It took a skilled, sensitive caller to raise the right chant to fit the task at hand and the mood of the men. Using tonal boundaries and melodic style typical of the blues, each caller had his own signature. The effectiveness of a caller to move his men has been likened to how a preacher can move a congregation." Typical songs featured a two-line, four-beat couplet to which members of the gang would tap their lining bars against the rails until the men were in perfect time and then the caller would call for a hard pull on the third beat of a four-beat chant. Veteran section gangs lining track, especially with an audience, often embellished their work with a one-handed flourish and with one foot stepping out and back on beats four, one, and two, between the two-armed pulls on the lining bars on beat three. USC-Columbia has a vintage gandy dancer video which demonstrates the singing, dancing-like rhythm, lining tool, and a very large crew.

=== Documentary ===
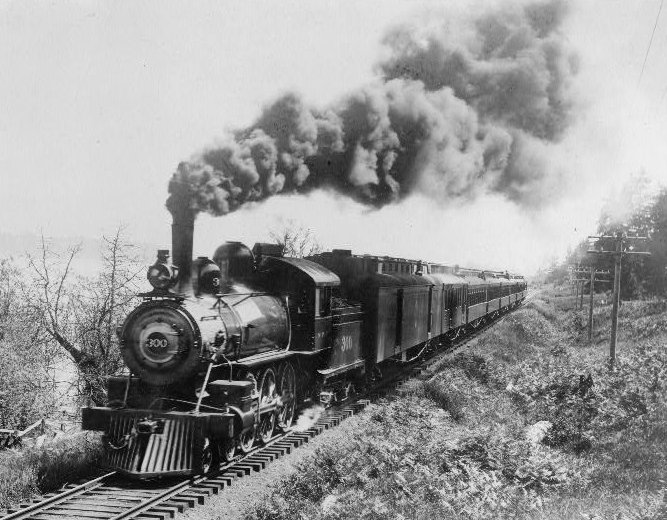
North Coast Limited train of the Northern Pacific Railway, around 1900. Photo illustrates the track, railroad ties, and the built-up bed, which section crews were required to maintain.

In 1994, folklorist Maggie Holtzberg, working as a folklore fieldworker to document traditional folk music in Alabama, produced a documentary film Gandy Dancers. Holtzberg relates,

"Knowing that the occupational art of calling was fast receding into the collective memories of railroad retirees, I was motivated to locate individuals and document what I could of their passive repertoire of work song lore, before it was lost. At the start, I contacted railroad company officials. When I asked about finding gandy dancers to talk to, there was often a short pause and then a perplexed comment as to how I knew of this arcane tradition. One man laughed and told me I would need to contact a medium since the use of section gangs was abolished in the 1960s. There were, however, some encouraging leads. An owner of a railroad maintenance company remembered "one caller with a real high pitched voice who could go ten hours a day and never repeat a chant." He agreed that it was important to document what remained of the calling tradition but said, 'One man couldn't begin to explain the process of lining track. You would have to get a crew together to do it,' which, in the end, was exactly what we did."

It had been many years since modern machinery had replaced section crews, so Holtzberg spoke with older or retired roadmasters who might remember the callers, or know where they might be living. She managed to locate a number of callers and interviewed them in their homes. However, the men found it difficult to call track in their living room as opposed to being out on the track with the sound of rapping lining bars to call against. They met at a nearby railroad club that was rebuilding a depot museum. In this familiar environment the men quickly began to remember the old calls, and especially so when a train passed by blowing its whistle. Holtzberg recalls the words of John Cole, at 82 the oldest of the men:

"Listen to that train. Yeah! That's a train! The hawk and buzzard went up north . . . You hear it blowing. I got a gal live behind the jail . . . That's a train . . . all it took was that noise." The train whistle blew and dopplered down in pitch.

The film was completed in 1994 and is available at the Folkstreams website. The trailer for the film is available at YouTube.

=== Typical call lyrics ===
The caller simultaneously motivated and entertained the men and set the timing through work songs that derived distantly from call and response traditions brought from Africa and sea shanties, and more recently from cotton-chopping songs, blues, and African-American church music. A good caller could go on all day without ever repeating a call. The caller needed to know the best calls to suit a particular crew or occasion. Sometimes calls with a religious theme were used and other times calls that would evoke sexual imagery were in order. An example:

I don't know but I've been told
Susie has a jelly roll (Note: Jelly roll is an old black slang term for the vulva.)
I don't know...huh
But I've been told...huh
Susie has...huh
A jelly roll...huh

In these calls the men begin to tap their gandy against the rail during the first two lines to get in rhythm and unison. Then with each "huh" grunt the men throw their weight forward on their gandy to slowly bring the rail back into alignment.

Up and down this road I go
Skippin' and dodging a 44
Hey man won't you line 'um...huh
Hey won't you line 'um...huh
Hey won't you line 'um...huh
Hey won't you line 'um...huh

Retired gandy dancer John Cole explained spike driving songs in the documentary Gandy Dancers.

"So gandy dancing goes in with the music. That's the way it’s been since way back. In the beginning of the railroad, you had to line it up. That’s where the gandy dancers come in. And you even gandy danced behind a maul. Even spiking, you make the spike maul talk; you sing to it. Like when you’re driving a spike down. [SINGING] “Big cat, little cat, teeniny kitten. Big cat!” That’s you driving the spike as hard as you could. He’d holler, “Make a wheel out of that maul.” And that means spike fast. And so, with two of us spiking, you make that maul talk! “Big cat, little cat, teeniny kitten,” and that spike would be down."

In 1996 two former callers, John Henry Mealing and Cornelius Wright, received National Heritage Fellowship awards as "Master Folk and Traditional Artists" for their demonstrations of this form of African-American folk art.

=== Military cadence calls ===
In the armed services, a military cadence call, also known as a Jody call, is a traditional call-and-response work song sung by military personnel while running or marching. As a sort of work song, military cadences take their rhythms from the work being done. Many cadences have a call and response structure wherein one soldier initiates a line and the remaining soldiers complete it, thus instilling teamwork and camaraderie for completion. Like lining calls, they also serve to mock one's superiors, vent anger and frustration, relieve boredom, and to boost spirits by poking fun or boasting.

It is believed that Private Willie Lee Duckworth Sr., who was stationed at Fort Slocum, New York as one of eight “Colored Infantrymen” in 1944, made up “Sound Off”, also known as the “Duckworth Chant”, which is used to this day in the U.S.Army and other branches of the military. Media researcher Barry Dornfeld, who co-authored the documentary "Gandy Dancer", believes that Duckworth's military cadence calls were influenced by his familiarity with track lining calls. Dornfeld writes, "I recently uncovered a connection between the southern African American tradition of call-and-response works songs and military cadence calls used in drill training, popularly known as “Jody calls.”

Duckworth, who was born in 1924 in Washington County, Georgia, would have been familiar with the use of work chants sung for all kinds of agricultural work. He was also the same generation of the gandy dancers who used chants to line track. At the time he was drafted to serve in WW II, Duckworth was working in a sawmill. He was sent to a provisional training center in Fort Slocum, N.Y., in March 1944. As the story goes, Duckwork, on orders from a non-commissioned officer, improvised his own drill for the soldiers in his unit. Soon after, all the ranks were buzzing and keeping rhythm. Col. Bernard Lentz, who was the base commander at the Fort, approached Duckworth and asked where he developed his unique chant. “I told him it came from calling hogs back home,” Duckworth said. “I was scared, and that was the only thing I could think of to say.”

== Popular culture ==
The Gandy Dancer State Trail is a 47-mile rail trail for hiking, biking and other recreational uses, that follows the old Minneapolis, St. Paul and Sault Ste. Marie railroad grade from St. Croix Falls, Wisconsin, through a bit of eastern Minnesota and terminating in Superior Wisconsin.

"The Gandy Dancers' Ball" is a song recorded by Frankie Laine in 1951, but with gandy dancers as actual dancers at a railroad workers' ball. Laine sang it with a chorus of dancers in the 1955 comedy film Bring Your Smile Along.

In 1962, The Ventures recorded the song "Gandy Dancer", an original instrumental composition that was released on their album Going to the Ventures Dance Party.

Singer/political activist Bruce "Utah" Phillips, in Moose Turd Pie, told a tall tale of working as a gandy dancer in the American southwest. Phillips ascribed the source of the workers' shovels to the possibly mythical Gandy Shovel Company of Chicago.

Gandy dancers are celebrated in The Gandy Dancer Festival, in Mazomanie, Wisconsin.

The Ann Arbor (Michigan) railroad station was converted into a restaurant called the Gandy Dancer.

Folk singer Huddie Ledbetter (aka Lead Belly), sang about the work of the gandy dancer in the lyrics of an unaccompanied work song, "Linin' Track". It has since been recorded by many others, including Dave "Snaker" Ray and Taj Mahal.

The bassist Fred Turner of the rock group Bachman-Turner Overdrive wrote a song called "Little Gandy Dancer" that appeared on the group's first album in 1973.

In the 2005 point-and-click adventure game, Last Train to Blue Moon Canyon, a series of achievable titles could be obtained by performing various actions. One of these titles was the 'Gandy Dancer', bestowed on players for demonstrating their effective dance routines.

The Winter Park Resort in Winter Park, Colorado, has a ski run named "Gandy Dancer".

== See also ==
- Field hollers
- List of train songs
- Military cadence
- Railroad shopmen
- Sea shanties
- Waulking songs
- Work songs
