= Negro Sinful Songs =

Studio album by Lead Belly
- Released: 1939
- Recorded: April 1, 1939, New York City
- Genre: Folk; blues
- Length: 30:26
- Label: Musicraft Records
- Producer: Alan Lomax

Lead Belly chronology
| Negro Sinful Songs (1939) | The Midnight Special and Other Southern Prison Songs (1941) |

Negro Sinful Songs (or Negro Sinful Songs Sung by Lead Belly) is a 1939 album by Lead Belly, produced by Alan Lomax. On April 1, 1939, Lead Belly had a recording session with Musicraft Records. There were a total of 14 takes, with 10 of them being selected for the album. Negro Sinful Songs was originally released as a five-disc collection of 10" 78 rpm records, catalog number Musicraft Album 31.

The first song on the album, "Frankie and Albert," had to be split into two parts due to play time constraints of 78 rpm discs (each side could hold about three minutes of sound). Originally, both halves of the song were issued on the first disc of the album, on side A and B. At some point after the first pressing, the second half of the song was moved to side A of the second disc. This was done to accommodate automatic record changers, which could easily move from one disc to another but not flip discs. "Looky, Looky, Yonder," "Black Betty," and "Yallow Women's Door Bells" were recorded as one continuous take and therefore have the same matrix number. The same goes for "Ain't Goin' Down to the Well No Mo'" and "Go Down Old Hannah." As well as, "Poor Howard" and "Green Corn." Each matrix number was given its own side of a record.

In 1994, Document Records released digital remasters of these songs on the album Leadbelly: Complete Recorded Works 1939–1947 in Chronological Order, Volume 1: 1 April 1939 to 15 June 1940, catalog number DOCD-5226.

== Track listing ==
Disc one
| No. | Title | Matrix Number | Length |
|---|---|---|---|
| 1. | "Frankie and Albert (First Half)" | GM-499-K | 2:52 |
| 2. | "Frankie and Albert (Completion)" | GM-499-A | 3:08 |

Disc two
| No. | Title | Matrix Number | Length |
|---|---|---|---|
| 1. | "Looky, Looky, Yonder" | GM-503-M | 1:00 |
| 2. | "Black Betty" | GM-503-M | 0:57 |
| 3. | "Yallow Women's Door Bells" | GM-503-M | 1:03 |
| 4. | "Ain't Goin' Down to the Well No Mo'" | GM-509-K | 2:01 |
| 5. | "Go Down Old Hannah" | GM-509-K | 1:16 |

Disc three
| No. | Title | Matrix Number | Length |
|---|---|---|---|
| 1. | "Poor Howard" | GM-505-K | 1:31 |
| 2. | "Green Corn" | GM-505-K | 1:42 |
| 3. | "Fannin Street" | GM-498 | 2:39 |

Disc four
| No. | Title | Matrix Number | Length |
|---|---|---|---|
| 1. | "The Boll Weevil" | GM-507-A | 3:07 |
| 2. | "De Kalb Blues" | GM-501 | 2:52 |

Disc five
| No. | Title | Matrix Number | Length |
|---|---|---|---|
| 1. | "The Gallis Pole" | GM-509-A | 3:02 |
| 2. | "The Bourgeois Blues" | GM-504 | 3:16 |
