= Traquero =

A traquero is a railroad track worker, or "section hand", especially a Mexican or Mexican American railroad track worker ("gandy dancer" in American English usage). The word derives from "traque", Spanglish for "track".

== Background ==
While the U.S. railroad track force in the Southwest and Midwest had always included some Mexican and Mexican American workers, their numbers were greatly increased following the exclusion of the Chinese and the recruitment and training of Mexican rail workers in Mexico as part of the construction of railroads in Mexico, financed largely by U.S. railroad companies, in particular, the Santa Fe, the Denver & Rio Grande Western and the Southern Pacific. The peak of traquero employment programs took place between 1880 and 1915, right before the Mexican Revolution and federal restrictions placed on Mexican immigration by the 1930s.

The Pacific Electric interurban system in the Los Angeles area was constructed and maintained by a workforce which was largely made up of traqueros.

Many traqueros lived in characteristic shanty towns of old boxcars which could be seen throughout the U.S. Southwest and Midwest, as far north as Chicago. Some of these could still be seen during the middle of the 20th century. Other communities of traqueros were founded as mobile tent camps, subsequently improved by the construction of more permanent dwellings, sometimes with the assistance of the railroad companies, but more often not.

The Watts section of Los Angeles originated as a traquero settlement at the intersection of the two major lines of the Pacific Electric. Another known community sprouted from its traquero origins was Perris, California, about 20 miles south of Riverside, California. The cities of Coachella and Indio in Southern California were also founded by traqueros in the early 1900s.

Black historian and journalist Thomas Fleming began his career as a bellhop and then spent five years as a cook for the Southern Pacific Railroad. In a weekly series of articles, he wrote of his memories of the Mexican section hands in the 1920s and 1930s. He recalled that the Southern Pacific gave them a place to sleep: old boxcars converted into two-room cabins. The company would take old boxcars, remove the wheels, and lay them alongside the tracks. He remembers that the workers had a lot of children who attended the public schools, but the ones he met during his childhood were "kind of meek, and took a lot of abuse from the other kids". Fleming says that "you found them right outside of all towns in California; that was part of the landscape." He suggests that they may have been the only ones who wanted to do the job because they got the lowest pay of any railroad workers, only about $40 a month.

== See also ==
- Chicano
- Gandy dancer
- Mexican Repatriation
- Chinese railroad workers
