= Negro Folk Music of Alabama =

Music Record Series

Negro Folk Songs of Alabama is a series of six records put out by Moses Asch and Harold Courlander on Folkways Records in the 1950s. The recordings include traditional African American music forms such as field calls and work songs. The recordings have subsequently been reissued. The Smithsonian Institution's Center for Folklife and Cultural Heritage in Washington, D.C. acquired Asch's Folkways recordings and business files after his death in 1986.

The recordings were made in rural Alabama in 1950. Courlander authored Negro Folk Music U.S.A..

== See also ==
- John Wesley Work Jr.
- Natalie Curtis-Burlin
- Newman Ivey White
- Thomas W. Talley
- Thomas P. Fenner
