= Michael Asch =

Canadian anthropologist

- Born: Michael I. Asch; April 9, 1943 (age 83); New York City, New York, United States
- Education: B.A. University of Chicago; Ph.D. Columbia University
- Occupation: Anthropologist
- Spouse: Margaret Asch
- Parent: Moses Asch
- Family: Sholem Asch (grandfather)

Michael I. Asch (born April 9, 1943) is an anthropologist in Canada. He became Professor Emeritus at the University of Alberta and works as a professor in the Department of Anthropology at the University of Victoria. Much of his work over the years has focused on issues of Indigenous rights and indigenous-settler relations in Canada.

Asch received a B.A. in anthropology from the University of Chicago and a Ph.D. from Columbia University. He has been a Fellow of the Royal Society of Canada since 2002 as a part of the Academy of Social Sciences.

He has been a part of several research projects and non-profit initiatives such as Intellectual Property Issues in Cultural Heritage (iPinCH) and Smithsonian Folkways Recordings. Asch is also credited as being one of the founding members the Canadian Anthropology Society/la société canadienne d'anthropologie (CASCA).

== Life and family ==
Asch was born on April 9, 1943, in New York City, New York. He is the son of Moses Asch, the founder of Folkway Records, and the grandson of Sholem Asch, a Polish-Jewish novelist, dramatist, and Yiddish language essayist. Asch was an only child and does not have any siblings. He is married to Margaret Asch.

== Career ==
=== Academics ===
Asch received his BA in anthropology from the University of Chicago and later went on to earn his PhD from Columbia University. He joined the University of Alberta in 1971, where he became the anthropology department chair from 1982 to 1986. He moved to Victoria, British Columbia, in the late 1990s, where he now works as a professor at the University of Victoria. He received a B.A. in anthropology from the University of Chicago and a Ph.D. from Columbia University.

=== CASCA ===
Asch, along with 120 other anthropologists, launched the Canadian Ethnology Society/société canadienne d’ethnologie (CESCE) in 1974. which would later become which would later become the Canadian Anthropology Society/la société canadienne d'anthropologie (CASCA). He was honoured as a Founding Fellow at CASCA 2013 at the University of Victoria.

=== Indigenous legal issues ===
Asch's first fieldwork project was with the Dene at Fort Wrigley in 1969. In the years following his initial fieldwork, Asch would be called upon to give testimony in a number of legal proceedings concerning the Dene of the Makenzie River Valley, as well as working with them in numerous negotiations with the Federal Government throughout the 1980s. After its commission by the Canadian Government in 1974, Asch along with another anthropologist, Scott Rushforth, were called upon as expert witnesses by the Indian Brotherhood of the Northwest Territories to give testimony during the Mackenzie Valley Pipeline Inquiry. His arguments on the matter included explanations about the importance of country food sources to Indigenous communities as well as disputing claims by Gemini North that the Indigenous food economy was dying. Asch's thought was that it was not appropriate to compare the share of overall food value produced through traditional methods between rural and urban communities, as urban centers would have a larger non-Indigenous population who were unlikely to get their food through methods such as hunting, trapping, or fishing. He further argued that the use of modern technology, such as guns or snowmobiles, by the Indigenous peoples of the region was not a sign of acculturation, as adopting new technology does not mean they are adopting new values.

In 1985 he gave testimony at Dick v. La Reine, a case involving a non-treaty member of the Esk'etemc First Nation, who was charged with killing a deer out of season without a permit. His testimony included statements about the importance of hunting and fishing as Indigenous cultural practices. He also provided further context to the testimonies of the Esk'etemc First Nation members by describing them in terms of their relationship to their cultural framework.

Asch worked as a senior research associate with the Royal Commission on Aboriginals Peoples (RCAP) from 1993 to 1994.

=== Non-profit and research initiatives ===
Asch convinced his father, Moses Asch, to donate the entirety of his Folkways Records collection shortly before his death in 1986. Part of the collection went to the University of Alberta, where Asch was currently serving as the Anthropology Department chair. He served on the board of the FolkwaysAlive initiative, founded in 2004 at the University of Alberta by Professors Regula Qureshi and Michael Frishkopf (with financial support from then VP Research Gary Kachanoski), in partnership with Smithsonian Folkways Recordings, during this time. Asch continues to hold a position as an advisory board member for Smithsonian Folkways Recordings, where he has hosted a number of radio shows and podcasts.

Asch worked with iPinCH, a seven-year research initiative spanning from 2008 to 2016, based at Simon Fraser University in British Columbia. His work on the project included researching historical documents relating to a number of treaties, Treaty 4, Treaty 6, and Treaty 11. He did a presentation on Treaty Relations as a Method of Resolving IP Issues Project at the iPinCH Fall Gathering in 2014.

== Awards and recognitions ==
- The Weaver-Tremblay Award (2001)
- Fellow of the Royal Society of Canada in the Academy of Social Sciences (2002)
- CASCA Founding Fellow (2013)
- Canada Prize in Social Sciences for his book On Being Here to Stay: Treaties and Aboriginal Rights (2015)

== Works ==
=== Books ===
- On Being Here to Stay: Treaties and Aboriginal Rights (2015)
- Home and native Land: Aboriginal Rights and the Canadian Constitution (1984)
- Aboriginal and Treaty Rights in Canada: Essays on Law, Equality, and Respect for Difference (1997)
- Resurgence and Reconciliation: Indigenous-Settler Relations and Earth Teachings (as editor) (2018)

=== Podcasts ===
- Sounds to Grow On (2009-2010)
- IPinCH Conversations / Michael Asch on Treaty Relations (2014)
