= Field holler =

Historical type of vocal work song

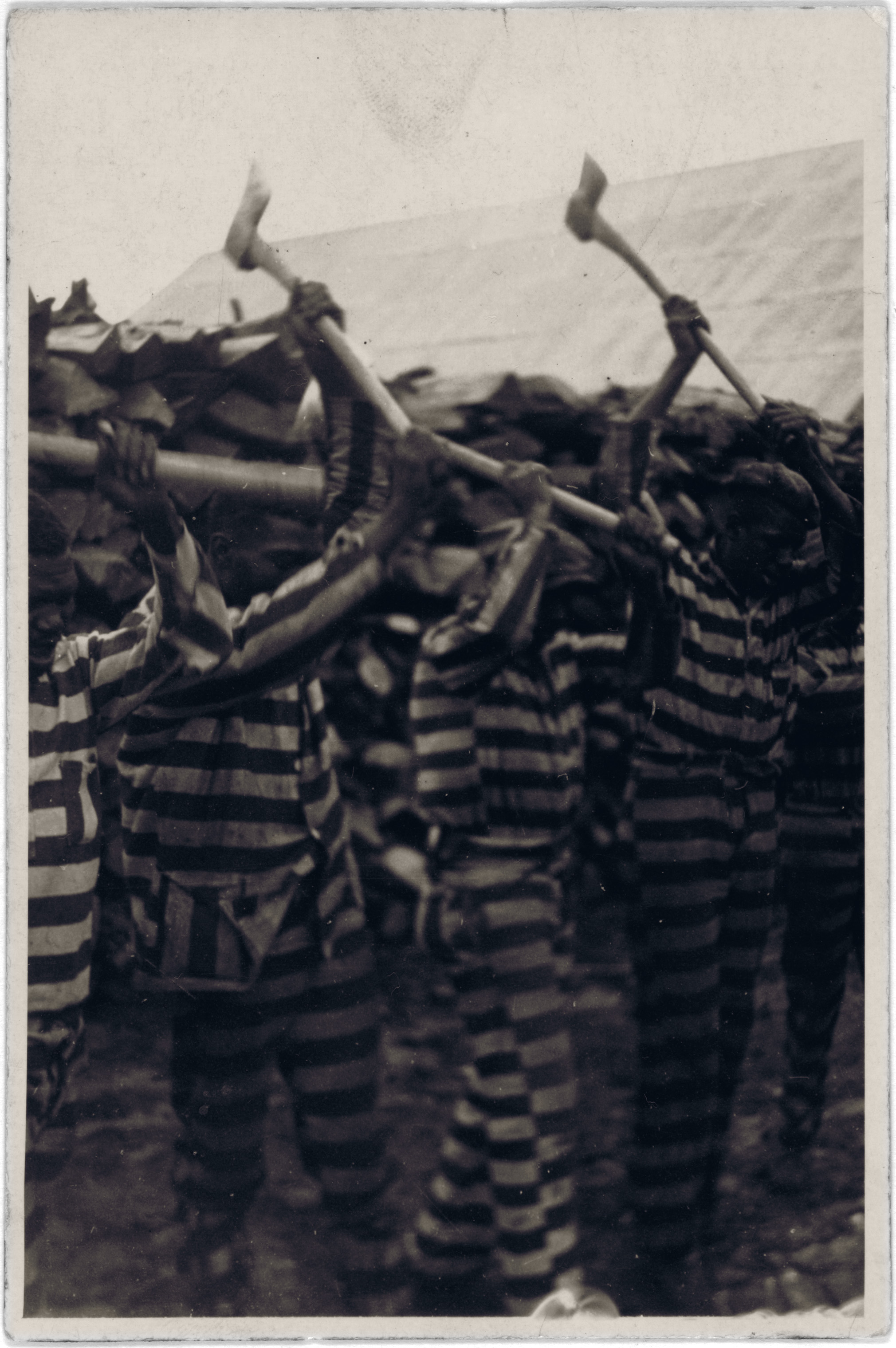
Chain gang singing in South Carolina

The field holler or field call is mostly a historical type or figure of vocal work song sung by field slaves in the United States (and later by African American forced laborers accused of violating vagrancy laws) to accompany their tasked work, to communicate usefully, or to vent feelings. It differs from the collective work song in that it was sung solo, though early observers noted that a holler, or ‘cry’, might be echoed by other workers. Though commonly associated with cotton cultivation, the field holler was also sung by levee workers, and field hands in rice and sugar plantations. Field hollers are also known as corn-field hollers, water calls, and whoops. An early description is from 1853 and the first recordings are from the 1930s. The holler is closely related to the call and response of work songs and arhoolies. The Afro-American music form ultimately influenced strands of African American music, such as the blues and thereby rhythm and blues, as well as negro spirituals.

There had also been some instances where some white oat farmers in close proximity to black people in the southern United States adopted and employed the field holler.

== Description ==
It was described by Frederick Law Olmsted in 1853 as a "long, loud, musical shout, rising and falling and breaking into falsetto", a description that would also have fitted examples recorded a century later. Some hollers are wordless, like the field call by Annie Grace Horn Dodson. Some have elaborated syllables and melismas, such as the long example recorded at the Parchman Farm penitentiary in Mississippi in 1947, by "Bama", of a Levee Camp Holler.

Verbal, improvised lines were used as cries for water and food and cries about what was happening in their daily lives, as expressions of religious devotion, a source of motivation in repetitive work, and a way of presenting oneself over across the fields. They described the labor being done (e.g., corn shucking songs, mule-skinning songs) recounted personal experiences or the singer's thoughts, subtly insulted white work attendants, or used folk themes. An unidentified singer of a Camp Holler was urged on with shouts and comments by his friends, suggesting that the holler could also have a social role. Call and response arose as sometimes a lone caller would be heard and answered with another laborer's holler from a distant field. Some street cries might be considered an urban form of holler, though they serve a different function (like advertising a seller's product); an example is the call of ‘The Blackberry Woman’, Dora Bliggen, in New Orleans.

== Origins ==
The field holler has origins in the music of West Africa, where the majority of enslaved Africans in America originated. The historian Sylviane Diouf and ethnomusicologist Gerhard Kubik also identify Islamic music as an influence. Diouf notes a striking resemblance between the Islamic call to prayer (originating from Bilal ibn Rabah, an Abyssinian African Muslim in the early 7th century) and 19th-century field holler music, noting that both have similar lyrics praising God, melody, note changes, "words that seem to quiver and shake" in the vocal cords, dramatic changes in musical scales, and nasal intonation. She attributes the origins of field holler music to African Muslim slaves who accounted for an estimated 30% of African slaves in America. According to Kubik, "the vocal style of many blues singers using melisma, wavy intonation, and so forth is a heritage of that large region of West Africa that had been in contact with the Arabic-Islamic world of the Maghreb since the seventh and eighth centuries."

== Influence ==
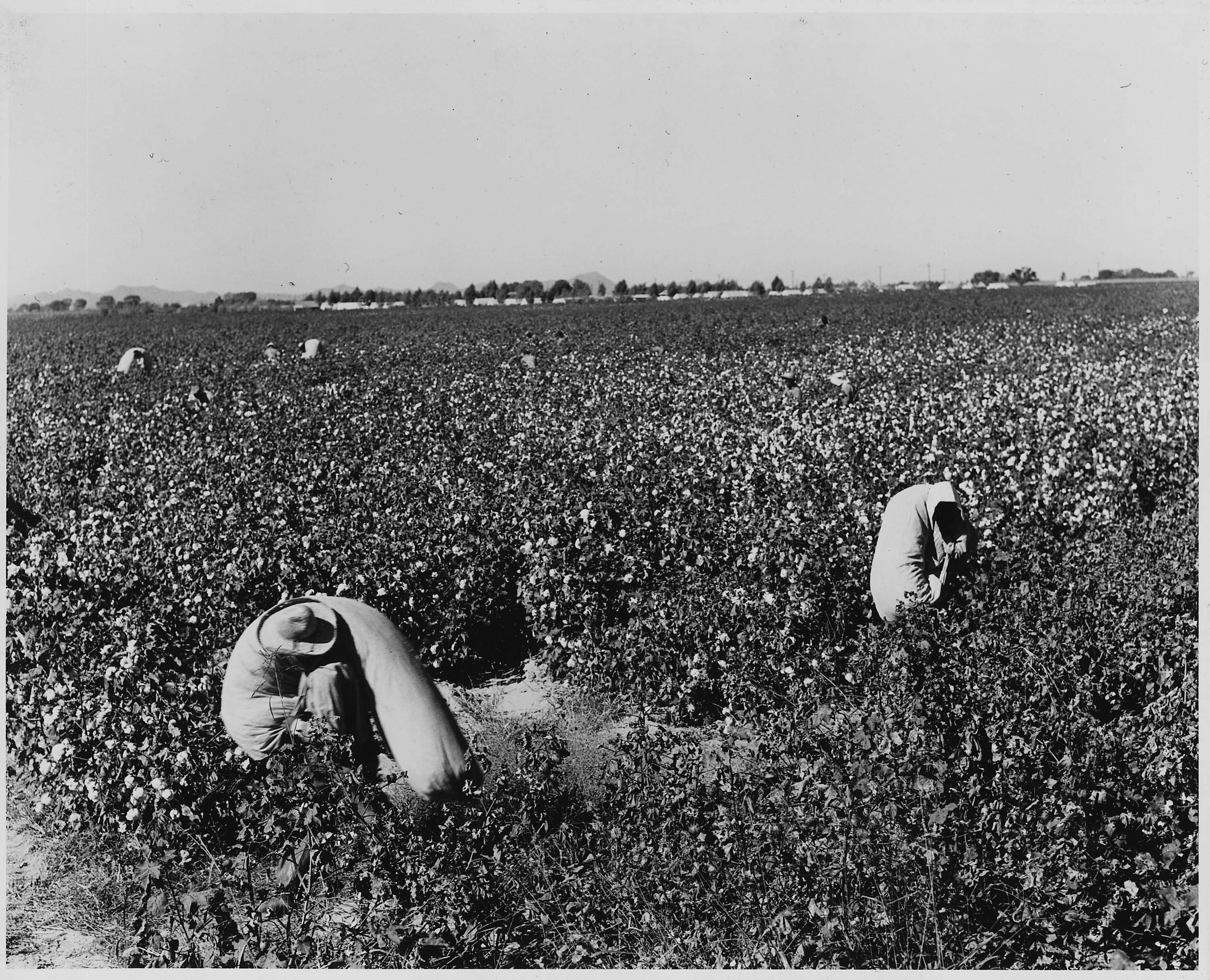
Picking cotton in a cotton field

Field hollers, cries and hollers of the slaves and later sharecroppers working in cotton fields, prison chain gangs, railway gangs (Gandy dancers) or turpentine camps are seen as the precursor to the call and response of African American spirituals and gospel music, to jug bands, minstrel shows, stride piano, and ultimately to the blues, to rhythm and blues, jazz and to African American music in general.

The field holler may in turn have been influenced by blues recordings. No recorded examples of hollers exist from before the mid-1930s, but some blues recordings, such as Mistreatin' Mama (1927, Negro Patti) by the harmonica player Jaybird Coleman, show strong links with the field holler tradition.

A white tradition of "hollerin'" may be of similar age, but has not been adequately researched. Since 1969 an annual National Hollerin' Contest has been held in Sampson County, North Carolina. The influence can be seen in the humwhistle. A humwhistle, otherwise known as "whistle-hum", creates two tones simultaneously and is a folk art. The two-tone sound is related to Inuit throat singing, and to a tradition of yodeling that originated in the Central Alps.

== See also ==
- An African Song or Chant from Barbados
- Blue note
- Twelve-bar blues
- Blues ballad
- Holler Blues
- Kulning
- Afro-American Work Songs in a Texas Prison, a 1966 documentary film

== Sources ==
- Charlton, Katherine (2003). Rock Music Styles - a history. Mc Graw-Hill, 4th ed., pp. 3. ISBN 0-07-249555-3.
- Oxford Music Online: Grove Music
- Southern, Eileen. The Music of Black Americans. 3rd. New York London: Norton, 1997. Print.
