= National Hollerin' Contest =

Competition & festival in North Carolina

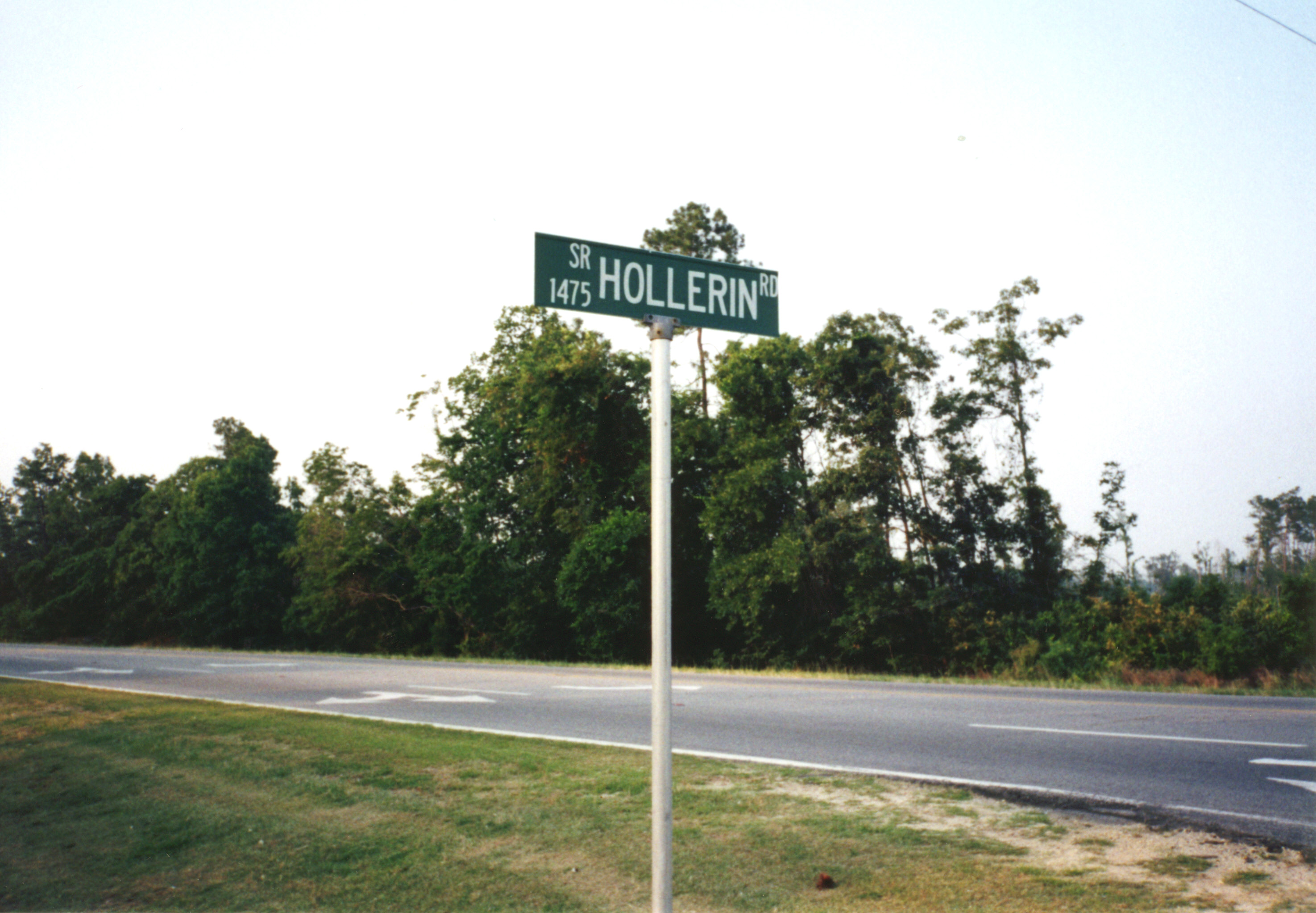
Hollerin Road street sign in Spivey's Corner

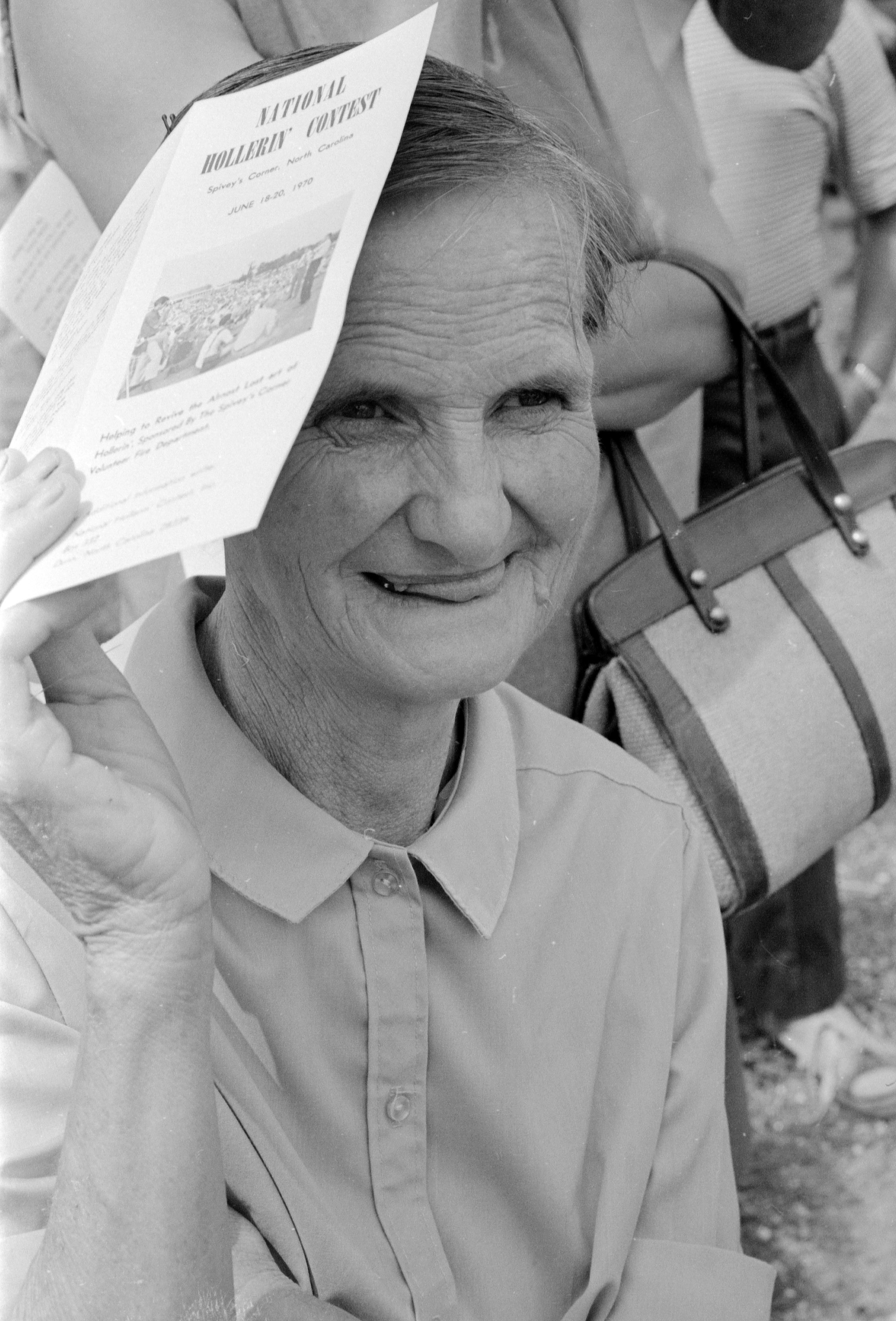
Spectator in 1970

The National Hollerin' Contest was an annual competition held in Spivey's Corner, North Carolina. It began in 1969, continuing until 2015.

The contest, formerly held on the third Saturday in June, was inaugurated to revive the almost-lost art of "hollerin'", a sophisticated vocal tradition that served as a means of long-distance communication between individuals as well as an amusing form of entertainment, before the widespread adoption of the telephone. The proceeds from the event were, and continue to be, donated to the Spivey's Corner Volunteer Fire Department.

Contestants from the contest have appeared on The Tonight Show Starring Johnny Carson, The Late Show with David Letterman, and The Late Show with Stephen Colbert.

In 2013, the National Hollerin' Contest became part of the Hollerin' Heritage Festival. The festival was held annually on the second Saturday in September on the property of the Spivey's Corner Volunteer Fire Department. The 2016 Hollerin' contest was cancelled after 47 years. A man named Robby Goodman, a former junior winner of the Hollerin' Contest, took the cancelled event and turned it into something new to continue the tradition. It was then known as the World Wide Hollerin' Festival and was held on October 8, 2016 at Paradise Acres in Hope Mills, North Carolina. This was the first and only World Wide Hollerin’ Festival, as it would not be continued the following year.
