= Holler blues =

Holler Blues refers to blues songs that are sung in the holler style, or the field holler style. Field hollers are also referred to as whoopings, arhoolies, and hollers. They began as vocal communications among slaves on plantations, which were not expressed by a group but by individuals. Hollers were used to communicate feelings or messages, and, as Frederick Douglass has written, were often melancholic and marked by vocal gymnastics. As the holler became rare, its aesthetic and qualities live on in blues songs.
