= Grey Goose (song) =

Traditional American folk song

"Grey Goose" (Roud 11684) is a traditional American folk song. Its subject is a preacher who hunts and captures a grey goose for dinner on a Sunday. He tries to kill the goose prior to eating it, but no matter how hard he tries, he cannot kill it, the implication being that he had not properly observed the Sabbath (however, there are other folk songs which may or may not have existed before this song that feature a Grey Goose, but not a preacher, that have a similar theme of the grey goose being indestructible). The various methods the preacher used to unsuccessfully kill the grey goose were, in order according to the song:

- Shooting it
- Boiling it
- Feeding it to a hog
- Cutting it with a mill-saw

It was recorded by Lead Belly in the 1930s. An instrumental version of this song was covered by members of the American band Nirvana and the Screaming Trees under the band name the Jury in Seattle in August 1989. The song was not released until 2004 on the box set titled With the Lights Out. In 2006, the children's music band Dan Zanes and Friends recorded a version of this song for the album Catch That Train. In 2010, the song was recorded with the simple accompaniment using harmonica and drums by Country Blues artist and Blues in Schools educator, Big Jon Short for his album Big Shorty. The song was also recorded by the band British Sea Power for one of the B-sides of their single "Please Stand Up". A poignant version of the song also was recorded by Sweet Honey in the Rock on the Grammy award-winning album A Vision Shared produced by CBS as a tribute to Lead Belly (and Woody Guthrie) for Smithsonian Folkways.

== In popular culture ==
The Burl Ives version was included in the Jonathan Lethem novel Dissident Gardens. The grey goose in the song was treated as a symbol of the "irrevocable destiny of the working class."

The song was featured in the soundtrack for Wes Anderson's Fantastic Mr. Fox.

During his visit to North America, German theater practitioner and playwright Bertolt Brecht was inspired by Lead Belly and rich American folk-music traditions. He ultimately wrote a poem entitled "Die haltbare Graugans", which loosely means 'The indestructible grey goose'. This poem alters some lyrics - for instance, the six weeks turn into "sechs Jahr", meaning six years. The conditions of the goose remain the same (i.e. being shot, boiled, thrown to a sow, and tossed into a mill). German composer Hanns Eisler, who frequently collaborated with Brecht, set this poem as an original song for voice and piano. Baritone Holger Falk and pianist Steffen Schleiermacher included this song on their album "Hanns Eisler Lieder Vol. 2".
