= Lead Belly =

American folk and blues musician (1888–1949)

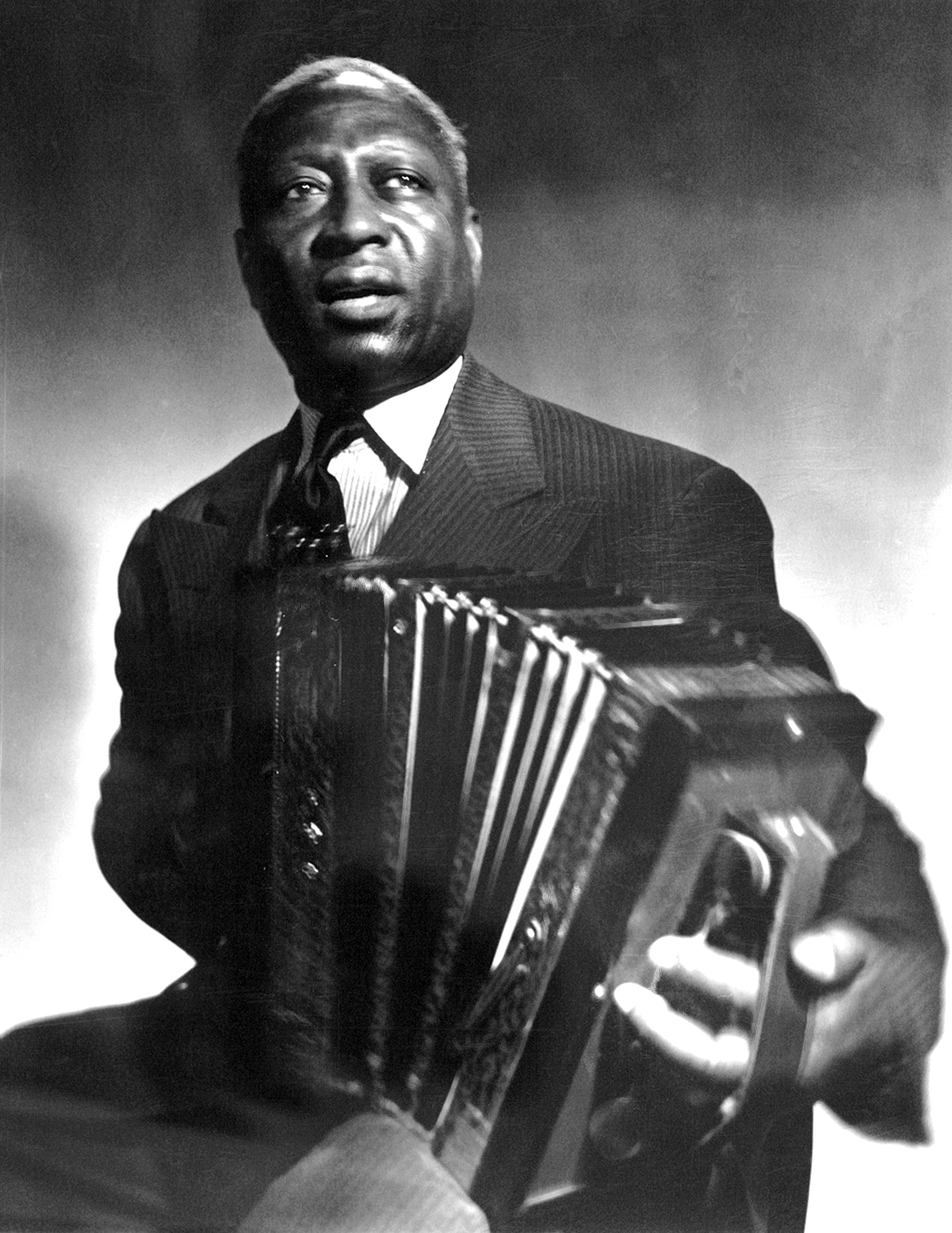
- Ledbetter with a melodeon c. 1942

Background information
- Also known as: Lead Belly; Leadbelly
- Born: Huddie William Ledbetter; January 15, 1888 (disputed); Mooringsport, Louisiana, U.S.
- Died: December 6, 1949 (aged 61) New York City, U.S.
- Genres: Blues; folk; gospel; songster
- Occupations: Musician; songwriter
- Instruments: Guitar; vocals; accordion; piano
- Years active: 1903–1949
- Labels: RCA Victor, Asch, Capitol
- Spouse: Martha Promise Ledbetter (m. 1935)

Huddie Ledbetter (January 20, 1889 – December 6, 1949), better known by the stage name Lead Belly, was an American folk and blues singer. He was notable for his vocals, twelve-string guitar, and the folk standards he introduced, including his renditions of "In the Pines" (also known as "Where Did You Sleep Last Night?" and “Black Girl”), "Pick a Bale of Cotton", "Goodnight, Irene", "Black Betty", "Midnight Special", "Cotton Fields", and "Boll Weevil". In addition to vocals and guitar, Ledbetter also played piano, mandolin, harmonica, violin, and accordion. In some recordings he used clapping or stomping.

Ledbetter's songs covered several genres, including gospel music, blues, and folk music, as well as topics including women, liquor, prison life, racism, cowboys, work, sailors, cattle herding, and dancing. He wrote songs about newsworthy people, such as Franklin D. Roosevelt, Adolf Hitler, Jean Harlow, Jack Johnson, the Scottsboro Boys, and Howard Hughes. Ledbetter was posthumously inducted into the Rock and Roll Hall of Fame in 1988 and the Louisiana Music Hall of Fame in 2008.

Though many releases credit him as "Leadbelly," he wrote his stage name as "Lead Belly". This is the spelling on his tombstone and is used by the Lead Belly Foundation. He did not care for the "Lead Belly" stage name. He always introduced himself by his given name, Huddie Ledbetter.

== Biography ==
=== Personal life ===
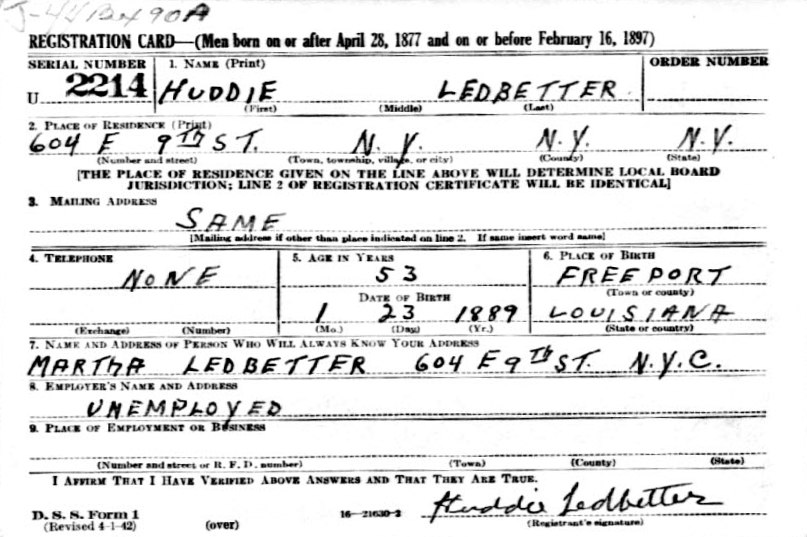
Ledbetter's draft registration card in 1942, with an address in the East Village, Manhattan.

The only son of Sallie Brown and Wesley Ledbetter (she had an older son, and the couple adopted a daughter when Huddie was a toddler), Huddie Ledbetter was born on a plantation near Mooringsport, Louisiana. On his World War II draft registration card in 1942, his birthplace is "Freeport" (Shreveport), Louisiana.

There is uncertainty over his date and year of birth. The Lead Belly Foundation gives his birth date as January 20, 1889, as does his 1949 passport. His grave marker gives the year 1889, and his 1942 draft registration card states January 23, 1889. The 1900 United States census lists "Hudy Ledbetter" as 12 years old, born January 1888. The 1910 and 1930 censuses give his age as corresponding to a birth in 1888. The 1940 census lists his age as 51, with information supplied by wife Martha. These records were made by census takers, and ages and dates were defined by the date the information was collected. The books Blues: A Regional Experience by Eagle and LeBlanc and Encyclopedia of Louisiana Musicians by Tomko give January 23, 1888, while the Encyclopedia of the Blues gives January 20, 1888. There is no evidence in these sources that he had a middle name. His father and grandfather were named Wesley.

His parents cohabited for several years. They married on February 26, 1888. When Huddie was five years old, the family settled in Harrison County, Texas, where they became landowners.

By the 1910 census of Harrison County, Texas, "Hudy Ledbetter" was living next door to his parents in a separate household with his first wife, Aletha "Lethe" Henderson. Aletha, born in 1890, is recorded as age 19 and married one year. Ledbetter's uncle Terrell gave him his first instrument in Texas, an accordion. Ledbetter and his wife did not have children when they moved to the Dallas/Fort Worth area. They worked as farm laborers while Ledbetter, in his early twenties, sought opportunities as a musician.

=== Music career ===
By 1903, fifteen year-old Ledbetter was already a "musicianer", a singer and guitarist of some note. He performed to Shreveport audiences in St. Paul's Bottoms, a red-light district. He began to develop his own style of music after exposure to the various musical influences on Shreveport's Fannin Street, a row of saloons, brothels, and dance halls in the Bottoms. This area is now referred to as Ledbetter Heights.

In 1915, he briefly served on a Texas chain gang, from which he escaped. In 1918, under the name of Walter Boyd and living in Bowie County, Texas, he was convicted of murder and sentenced to 30 years in prison. After writing a song pleading for clemency, Governor Pat Morris Neff pardoned Ledbetter in 1925. In 1930, he was arrested, convicted of attempted murder, and sentenced to the Louisiana State Penitentiary, also known as the Angola Penitentiary, where folklorists John Lomax and his teenaged son, Alan, "discovered" him in 1933. They were recording varieties of folk music in the South to preserve traditional music for the Library of Congress. This was one of numerous cultural projects the federal government sponsored during the Great Depression to advance social welfare through job creation.

Ledbetter's vibrant tenor and extensive repertoire impressed the Lomaxes. They recorded him in 1933 on portable but permanent aluminum disc recording equipment. They returned with new and better equipment in July 1934, capturing numerous additional songs. While in prison, Ledbetter may have first heard the traditional prison song "Midnight Special"; his versions became famous. On August 1, Ledbetter was released after having served nearly all of his minimum sentence. The Lomaxes had taken a record and a petition seeking his release to Louisiana Governor Oscar K. Allen at Ledbetter's request, but there is no evidence that this had any effect on his release. A prison official later wrote to John Lomax denying that Ledbetter's singing had anything to do with his release. (State prison records confirm he was eligible for this due to good behavior.) Both Ledbetter and the Lomaxes promoted the myth that Ledbetter had sung his way to freedom again.

With the Great Depression ongoing and Alan Lomax ill and unable to assist his father in song collecting, Ledbetter and John Lomax teamed up in September, 1934. For three months, the 46-year-old Ledbetter assisted the 67-year-old academic in his folk song collecting around the South.

In December 1934, Ledbetter participated in a "smoker" (group sing-along) at a Modern Language Association meeting at a hotel in Philadelphia. He was written up in the press as a convict who had sung his way out of prison. On New Year's Day 1935, the pair arrived in New York City, where Lomax was scheduled to meet with his publisher, Macmillan, about a new collection of folk songs. The newspapers were eager to write about the "singing convict". Time magazine made one of its first March of Time newsreels about him. Lead Belly attained fame but not fortune.

In January 1935, he married his girlfriend, Martha Promise. She came north from Louisiana to join him and the Lomaxes in Wilton, Connecticut, as they began work on a book about Lead Belly's music. On January 23–25, 1935, Ledbetter had the first of several commercial recording sessions with American Record Corporation (ARC). These sessions, combined with two others on February 5 and March 25, yielded 53 takes. Only six were released during Ledbetter's lifetime. ARC released these songs on six different labels they owned: Banner, Melotone, Oriole, Perfect, Romeo, and Paramount. These recordings achieved little commercial success. Part of the reason for the poor sales may have been that ARC released only his blues songs rather than the folk songs he would later become better known for. Ledbetter continued to struggle financially. He earned his income through touring, not record sales.

While in Wilton, the Lomaxes recorded Ledbetter's songs for the book Negro Folk Songs As Sung by Lead Belly (1936), and purportedly captured his life story. The book contains numerous sensational accounts of uncertain authenticity. The authors said the work was not an "accurate biography" but a "loosely woven texture of unreconstructed stories."

In March 1935, Ledbetter accompanied John Lomax on a previously scheduled two-week lecture tour of colleges and universities in the Northeast, culminating at Harvard. At the end of the month, John Lomax decided he could no longer work with Ledbetter. He gave him and Martha enough money to return by bus to Louisiana. He also gave Martha the money her husband had earned during three months of performing, but in installments, on the pretext that Lead Belly would spend it all on drinking if given a lump sum. From Louisiana, Ledbetter successfully sued Lomax for his full earnings and release from his management contract. The quarrel was bitter, with hard feelings on both sides. In the midst of the legal wrangling, Ledbetter wrote to Lomax proposing they team up again. This did not happen. The book that the Lomaxes published about Lead Belly in the fall of 1936 was a commercial failure.

In January 1936, Ledbetter returned to New York on his own, without John Lomax, in an attempted comeback. He performed twice a day at Harlem's Apollo Theater during the Easter season. He developed a live dramatic recreation of the March of Time newsreel (itself a recreation) about his prison encounter with John Lomax, when he was still wearing uniform stripes. By this time, he was no longer associated with Lomax.

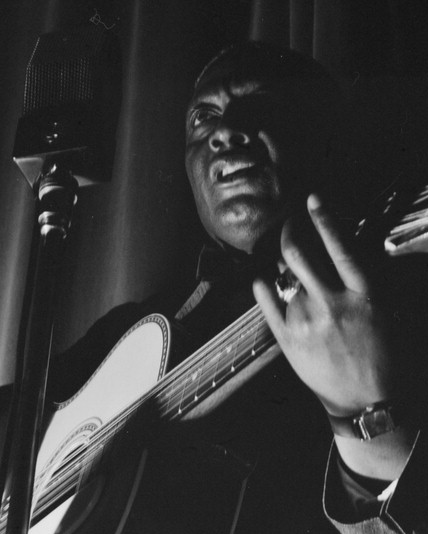
Ledbetter at the National Press Club in Washington, D.C. between 1938 and 1948

Life magazine ran a three-page article titled "Lead Belly: Bad Nigger Makes Good Minstrel" in its issue of April 19, 1937. It included a full-page, color (rare in those days) picture of him sitting on grain sacks playing his guitar and singing. Also included was a photograph of his wife Martha Promise (identified in the article as his manager). Other photos showed Ledbetter's hands playing the guitar (with the caption "these hands once killed a man"), Texas Governor Pat M. Neff, and the "ramshackle" Texas State Penitentiary. The article attributes both of his pardons to his singing his petitions to the governors, who were so moved that they pardoned him. The article closed by saying that Lead Belly "may well be on the brink of a new and prosperous period."

Ledbetter failed to stir the enthusiasm of Harlem audiences. Instead, he attained success playing at concerts and benefits for an audience of folk music aficionados. He developed his own style of singing and explaining his repertoire in the context of Southern black culture, having learned from his participation in Lomax's college lectures. He was especially successful with his repertoire of children's game songs. As a younger man in Louisiana, he had sung regularly at children's birthday parties. Black novelist Richard Wright wrote about him as a heroic figure in the Daily Worker, of which Wright was the Harlem editor. The two men became friends. In contrast to Wright, who was then a communist, commentators described Ledbetter as apolitical. He was known to support Wendell Willkie, the centrist Republican candidate for president, for whom he wrote a campaign song. Ledbetter also wrote the song "The Bourgeois Blues", which has class-conscious and anti-racist lyrics.

In 1939, Ledbetter was involved in an altercation after a small gathering in New York City and accused of stabbing a man. Alan Lomax, then 24, helped raise money for his legal expenses, dropping out of graduate school to do so. Based in part on Ledbetter's apparent notoriety, the judge sentenced him to a year in Rikers. After gaining release, Ledbetter appeared as a regular on Lomax and Nicholas Ray's CBS radio show Back Where I Come From, broadcast nationwide.

He performed in nightclubs with Josh White, becoming a fixture in New York City's folk music scene and befriending Sonny Terry, Brownie McGhee, Woody Guthrie, and Pete Seeger, all fellow performers on Back Where I Come From.

In 1940, Ledbetter recorded for RCA Victor, one of the biggest record companies at the time. These sessions in California were held on June 15 and 17, with the Golden Gate Quartet accompanying some songs. The recordings resulted in the album The Midnight Special and Other Southern Prison Songs, issued by Victor Records. The album included sheets with extensive notes and song texts prepared by Alan Lomax. According to Charles Wolfe and Kip Lornell, "it was one of the finest public presentations of Leadbelly's music: well recorded, well advertised, well documented. And the album justified its reputation as a landmark in African American folk music." Several of the recordings from these sessions were also issued as singles by Bluebird Records.

In 1941, mutual friends introduced Ledbetter to Moses "Moe" Asch. Asch owned a recording studio and small record label, which mainly released folk records for the local New York City market. He later founded Folkways Records. Between 1941 and 1944, Ledbetter released three albums under the Asch Recordings label. During the first half of the 1940s, Ledbetter recorded for the Library of Congress.

Ledbetter frequently performed Southern Blues at concerts by Si-lan Chen.

In 1944, he went to California, where he recorded sessions for Capitol Records. He lodged with a studio guitar player on Merrywood Drive in Laurel Canyon. He later returned to New York City. In 1949, Lead Belly had a regular radio show, Folk Songs of America, broadcast on station WNYC in New York, on Henrietta Yurchenco's show on Sunday nights. Later in the year, he began his first European tour with a trip to France, but fell ill before its completion and was diagnosed with amyotrophic lateral sclerosis (ALS), or Lou Gehrig's disease (a motor neuron disease). Ledbetter was the first successful American country blues musician in Europe. He performed his final concert at the University of Texas at Austin in a tribute to his former mentor, John Lomax, who had died the previous year. Martha also performed, singing spirituals with Ledbetter.

Ledbetter died later that year in New York City. He was buried in the Shiloh Baptist Church cemetery, in Mooringsport, Louisiana, 8 miles (13 km) west of Blanchard, in Caddo Parish. He is honored with a statue across from the Caddo Parish Courthouse, in Shreveport.

=== Legal issues ===
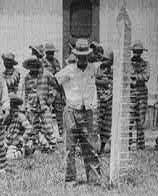
Lead Belly inside the Angola Prison, July 1934

Ledbetter was imprisoned multiple times beginning in 1915, when he was convicted of carrying a pistol and sentenced to time on the Harrison County chain gang. He escaped and found work in nearby Bowie County under the assumed name of Walter Boyd.

In June 1918, he was imprisoned at the Shaw State Prison Farm outside Dekalb, and later (May 1920) transferred to Imperial Farm (Central Unit) in Sugar Land, Texas, after being convicted of killing a relative, Will Stafford. In 1925, he was pardoned and released after writing a song to Texas Governor Pat Morris Neff seeking his freedom, having served the minimum seven years of a 7-to-35-year sentence. He was credited with good behavior, which included entertaining the guards and fellow prisoners. He also appealed for mercy to Neff's known religious beliefs. It was a testament to his persuasive powers, as Neff had run for governor on a pledge not to issue pardons (most Southern judicial systems had no provision for approving parole from prison). After meeting Ledbetter in 1924, Neff returned to the prison several times after he was incarcerated again. He brought guests to the prison on Sunday picnics to hear Ledbetter perform.

In 1930, Ledbetter was sentenced to Louisiana State Penitentiary (nicknamed "Angola") after a summary trial for attempted homicide for stabbing a man in a fight. In 1939, Ledbetter served his final jail term for assault after stabbing a man in a fight in Manhattan.

=== Nickname "Lead Belly" ===
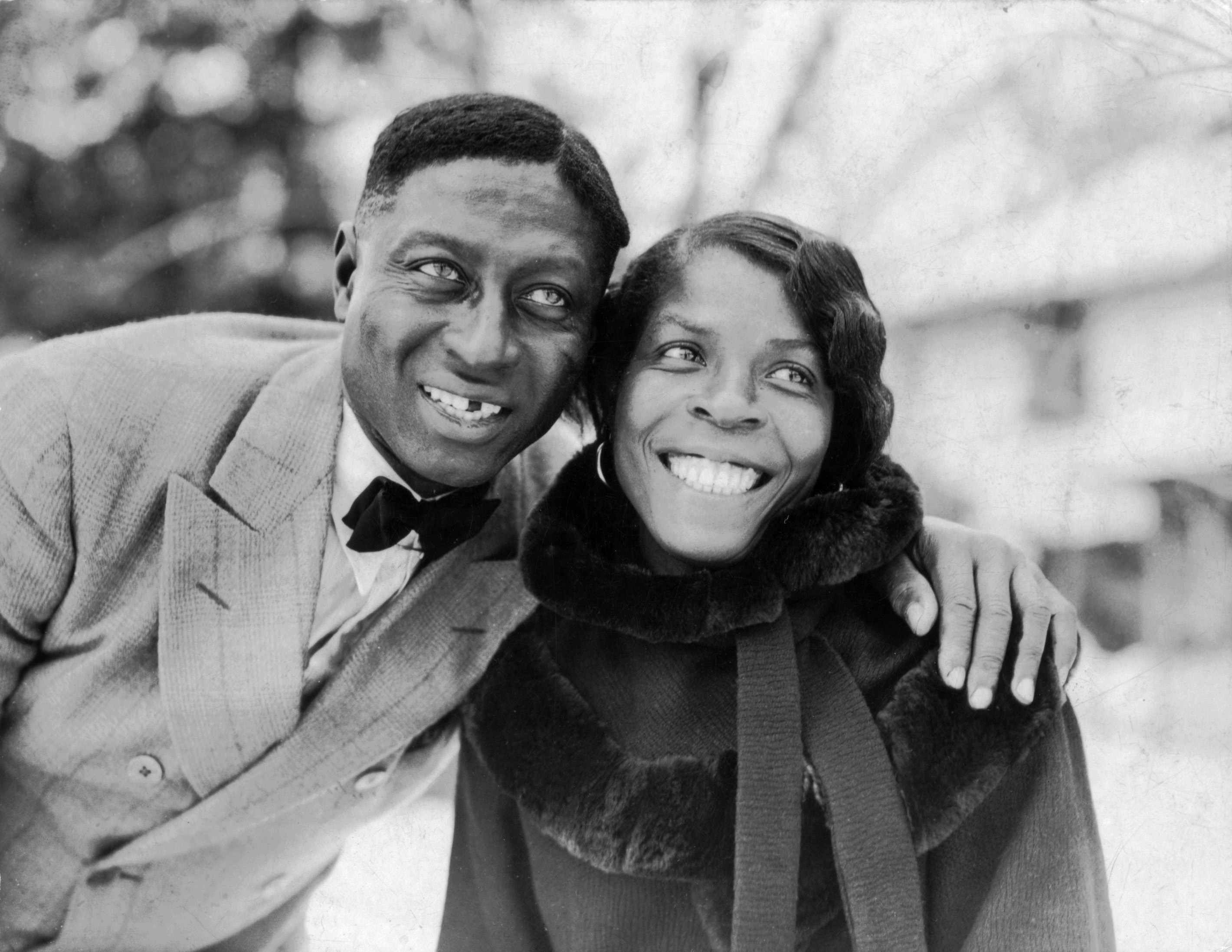
Lead Belly and Martha Promise Ledbetter, Wilton, Connecticut, February 1935

There are several conflicting stories about how the origin of the nickname "Lead Belly", but it probably happened while he was in prison. Some claim his fellow inmates called him "Lead Belly" as a play on his family name and his toughness. Others say he earned the name after being wounded in the stomach with buckshot. Another theory is that the name refers to his ability to drink moonshine, the homemade liquor that Southern farmers, black and white, made to supplement their incomes.

Blues singer Big Bill Broonzy thought it came from a supposed tendency to lie about as if "with a stomach weighted down by lead" in the shade when the chain gang was supposed to be working.

== Technique ==
Lead Belly at the Sunday Worker office, 1937

Lead Belly styled himself "King of the Twelve-String Guitar." Despite playing other instruments, such as the accordion, the most enduring image of Lead Belly as a performer is wielding his large Stella twelve-string. This guitar had a slightly longer scale length than a standard guitar, increasing the tension on the instrument, which, given the added tension of the six extra strings, meant that a trapeze-style tailpiece was needed to help resist bridge lifting. It had slotted tuners and ladder bracing.

Ledbetter played with finger picks much of the time. He used a thumb pick to provide walking bass lines described as "tricky" and "inventive", and occasionally to strum. This technique, combined with low tunings and heavy strings, gives many of his recordings a piano-like sound. Scholars have suggested much of his guitar playing was inspired by barrelhouse piano and the Mexican Bajo Sexto, a type of guitar that he encountered in Texas and Louisiana.

Ledbetter's tunings are debated by modern and contemporary musicians and blues enthusiasts alike, but it seems to be a down-tuned variant of standard tuning. Footage of his chording is scarce, so trying to decode his chords is difficult. It is likely that he tuned his guitar strings relative to one another, so that the actual notes shifted as the strings wore. Such down-tuning was a common technique before the development of truss rods. It was intended to prevent the instrument's neck from warping.

Ledbetter's playing style was popularized by Pete Seeger, who adopted the twelve-string guitar in the 1950s and released an instructional LP and book using Lead Belly as an example of the technique. In an April 1963 interview on Folk Music Worldwide, Seeger characterized Lead Belly as his mentor: "Yeah, and when I stop to think of it, he was my main music teacher although he didn't know it. I'd follow him around and watch his hands closely. I admired him so."

In some of the recordings in which Ledbetter accompanied himself, he grunted between verses, sometimes described as "haah!" Songs such as "Looky Looky Yonder", "Take This Hammer", "Linin' Track", and "Julie Ann Johnson" feature this vocalization. In "Take This Hammer", Lead Belly explained: "Every time the men say, 'Haah,' the hammer falls. The hammer rings, and we swing, and we sing." The "haah" sound can be heard in work chants sung by Southern railroad section workers, "gandy dancers", in which it was used to coordinate work crews as they laid and maintained tracks.

== Legacy ==
In 1976, a fictionalized biopic titled Leadbelly was released, directed by Gordon Parks and starring Roger E. Mosley as Lead Belly.

Richard Walters portrays Lead Belly in episode 21 of season 15 "Devil Music" (March 21, 2022) of the Canadian television period detective series Murdoch Mysteries.

In 1950, The Weavers' recording of their arrangement of Lead Belly's "Irene", released as "Good Night, Irene", was the first folk song to reach number one on the U.S. charts, selling some two million copies.

Kurt Cobain promoted the legacy of Lead Belly, and some modern rock audiences owe their familiarity with Lead Belly to Nirvana's performance of "Where Did You Sleep Last Night" (which Lead Belly called "In the Pines") on MTV Unplugged in New York. Cobain listed Lead Belly's Last Session Vol. 1 as one of the 50 most influential albums in the formation of Nirvana's sound. NME's included it in "The 100 Greatest Albums You've Never Heard list".

Ram Jam, an American rock band, had a hit with the song "Black Betty", which they adapted into a rock song in 1977. Lead Belly recorded "Black Betty" in 1939.

Bob Dylan credits Ledbetter for getting him into folk music. In his Nobel Prize lecture, Dylan said "somebody – somebody I'd never seen before – handed me a Lead Belly record with the song 'Cotton Fields' on it. And that record changed my life right then and there. Transported me into a world I'd never known. It was like an explosion went off. Like I'd been walking in darkness and all of the sudden the darkness was illuminated. It was like somebody laid hands on me. I must have played that record a hundred times." Dylan also pays homage to him in "Song to Woody" on his self-titled debut album.

Lead Belly recordings were instrumental in starting the British skiffle revival, which in turn produced several prominent musicians during the British Invasion. Lonnie Donegan's recording of "Rock Island Line", released as a single in late 1955, signaled the start of the skiffle craze. George Harrison of The Beatles was quoted as saying, "if there was no Lead Belly, there would have been no Lonnie Donegan; no Lonnie Donegan, no Beatles. Therefore no Lead Belly, no Beatles." In a BBC tribute in 1999, marking the 50th anniversary of Ledbetter's death, Van Morrison, sitting alongside Ronnie Wood of The Rolling Stones, claimed that the British popular music scene of the 1960s wouldn't have happened if it weren't for Lead Belly's influence. "I'd put my money on that," he said. Wood concurred.

Indian singer Bhupen Hazarika—who was influenced by spirituals as a student in the US—transcreated Lead Belly's singing of "We're in the Same Boat Brother" into the Assamese language as "Ami ekekhon nawore zatri" (আমি একেখন নাৱৰে যাত্ৰী). He later released a Bengali language version as "Mora jatri eki toronir" (মোরা যাত্রী একই তরণীর).

In 2001, English-Canadian blues singer Long John Baldry released his final studio album, Remembering Leadbelly. It contains cover versions of Lead Belly songs, and features a six-minute Alan Lomax interview.

George Ezra developed his singing style from trying to sing like Lead Belly. "On the back of the record, it said his voice was so big, you had to turn your record player down," Ezra says. "I liked the idea of singing with a big voice, so I tried it, and I could."

In 2015, several events were held in celebration of Lead Belly's 125th birthday. The Kennedy Center, in collaboration with the Grammy Museum, held Lead Belly at 125: A Tribute to an American Songster, a musical event featuring Robert Plant, Alison Krauss, and Buddy Miller with Viktor Krauss as headliners and Dom Flemons as host, with special appearances by Lucinda Williams, Alvin Youngblood Hart, Billy Hector, Valerie June, Shannon McNally, Josh White Jr., and Dan Zanes, among others. Also, in Washington, D.C., the Library of Congress held Bourgeois Town: Lead Belly in Washington DC, where Todd Harvey interviewed Ledbetter's family members about their relative, his contributions to American culture and world music, and an overview of the Lead Belly materials in the center's archive. In London, England, the Royal Albert Hall held Lead Belly Fest, a musical event featuring Van Morrison, Eric Burdon, Jools Holland, Billy Bragg, Paul Jones, and more.

=== The Titanic ===
Influenced by the sinking of the Titanic in April 1912, Ledbetter wrote the song "The Titanic", his first composition on the twelve-string guitar, which later became his signature instrument. Initially played when performing with Blind Lemon Jefferson (1893–1929) in and around Dallas, Texas, the song is about champion African-American boxer Jack Johnson's being denied passage on the Titanic. Johnson had been denied passage on a ship for being black, but it was not the Titanic. Still, the song includes the lyric "Jack Johnson tried to get on board. The Captain, he says, 'I ain't haulin' no coal!' Fare thee, Titanic! Fare thee well!" Ledbetter noted he had to leave out this passage when playing in front of white audiences.

=== "Stay woke" ===
In possibly the earliest audio recording of the phrase, Ledbetter urged Black listeners to "stay woke" in the spoken afterword to a 1938 recording of his song "Scottsboro Boys". The song tells the story of nine Black teenagers and young men falsely accused of raping two white women in Alabama in 1931. Ledbetter warns his listeners, "So I advise everybody, be a little careful when they go along through there—best stay woke, keep their eyes open."

== Discography ==
=== Singles ===
| Release year | Title (A-side/B-side) | Label | Catalog Number | Recording Date | Matrix Number | Notes |
|---|---|---|---|---|---|---|
| 1935 | All Out and Down Packin' Trunk | Banner | 33359 | January 23, 1935 | 16688-2 16685-1 | American Record Corporation simultaneously released these songs on six different labels they owned |
| 1935 | All Out and Down Packin' Trunk | Melotone | M13326 | January 23, 1935 | 16688-2 16685-1 | American Record Corporation simultaneously released these songs on six different labels they owned |
| 1935 | All Out and Down Packin' Trunk | Oriole | 8438 | January 23, 1935 | 16688-2 16685-1 | American Record Corporation simultaneously released these songs on six different labels they owned |
| 1935 | All Out and Down Packin' Trunk | Perfect | 0314 | January 23, 1935 | 16688-2 16685-1 | American Record Corporation simultaneously released these songs on six different labels they owned |
| 1935 | All Out and Down Packin' Trunk | Romeo | 5438 | January 23, 1935 | 16688-2 16685-1 | American Record Corporation simultaneously released these songs on six different labels they owned |
| 1935 | All Out and Down Packin' Trunk | Paramount | 14006 | January 23, 1935 | 16688-2 16685-1 | American Record Corporation simultaneously released these songs on six different labels they owned |
| 1935 | Four Day Worry Blues New Black Snake Moan | Banner | 33360 | January 23, 1935 | 16689-2 16691-2 | American Record Corporation simultaneously released these songs on six different labels they owned |
| 1935 | Four Day Worry Blues New Black Snake Moan | Melotone | M13327 | January 23, 1935 | 16689-2 16691-2 | American Record Corporation simultaneously released these songs on six different labels they owned |
| 1935 | Four Day Worry Blues New Black Snake Moan | Oriole | 8439 | January 23, 1935 | 16689-2 16691-2 | American Record Corporation simultaneously released these songs on six different labels they owned |
| 1935 | Four Day Worry Blues New Black Snake Moan | Perfect | 0315 | January 23, 1935 | 16689-2 16691-2 | American Record Corporation simultaneously released these songs on six different labels they owned |
| 1935 | Four Day Worry Blues New Black Snake Moan | Romeo | 5439 | January 23, 1935 | 16689-2 16691-2 | American Record Corporation simultaneously released these songs on six different labels they owned |
| 1935 | Four Day Worry Blues New Black Snake Moan | Paramount | 14017 | January 23, 1935 | 16689-2 16691-2 | American Record Corporation simultaneously released these songs on six different labels they owned |
| 1936 | Becky Deem, She Was a Gamblin' Girl Pig Meat Papa | Banner | 6-04-55 | January 23, 1935, March 25, 1935 | 16678-1 17181-1 | American Record Corporation simultaneously released these songs on six different labels they owned |
| 1936 | Becky Deem, She Was a Gamblin' Girl Pig Meat Papa | Melotone | 6-04-55 | January 23, 1935, March 25, 1935 | 16678-1 17181-1 | American Record Corporation simultaneously released these songs on six different labels they owned |
| 1936 | Becky Deem, She Was a Gamblin' Girl Pig Meat Papa | Oriole | 6-04-55 | January 23, 1935, March 25, 1935 | 16678-1 17181-1 | American Record Corporation simultaneously released these songs on six different labels they owned |
| 1936 | Becky Deem, She Was a Gamblin' Girl Pig Meat Papa | Perfect | 6-04-55 | January 23, 1935, March 25, 1935 | 16678-1 17181-1 | American Record Corporation simultaneously released these songs on six different labels they owned |
| 1936 | Becky Deem, She Was a Gamblin' Girl Pig Meat Papa | Romeo | 6-04-55 | January 23, 1935, March 25, 1935 | 16678-1 17181-1 | American Record Corporation simultaneously released these songs on six different labels they owned |
| 1936 | Becky Deem, She Was a Gamblin' Girl Pig Meat Papa | Paramount | 6-04-55 | January 23, 1935, March 25, 1935 | 16678-1 17181-1 | American Record Corporation simultaneously released these songs on six different labels they owned |
| 1940 | Sail On, Little Girl, Sail On Don't You Love Your Daddy No More? | Bluebird | B-8550 | June 15, 1940, June 17, 1940 | 051505 051325 | |
| 1940 | Alberta T.B. Blues | Bluebird | B-8559 | June 15, 1940 | 051507 051503 | |
| 1940 | Easy Rider Worried Blues | Bluebird | B-8570 | June 17, 1940 | 051322 051324 | |
| 1941 | Roberta The Red Cross Store Blues | Bluebird | B-8709 | June 15, 1940 | 051506 051504 | |
| 1941 | New York City You Can't Lose-a Me Cholly | Bluebird | B-8750 | June 17, 1940 | 051323-1 051326-1 | |
| 1941 | Good Morning Blues Leaving Blues | Bluebird | B-8791 | June 15, 1940 | 051501 051502 | |
| 1942 | I'm on My Last Go-Round | Bluebird | B-8981 | June 15, 1940 | 051508-1 | This was the b-side to "Thirsty Mama Blues" by the Hot Lips Page Trio |
| 1945 | Rock Island Line Eagle Rock Rag | Capitol | 10021 | October 4, 1944, October 27, 1944 | 398-3A1 457-2A | Included in the five-disc Capitol Album CE-16, The History of Jazz Vol. 1: The 'Solid' South |
| 1946 | Yellow Gal When the Boys Were on the Western Plain | Musicraft | 310 | February 17, 1944 | 5129 5130–1 | |
| 1946 | Roberta John Hardy | Musicraft | 311 | February 17, 1944 | 5126–3 5133 | |
| 1946 | Where Did You Sleep Last Night? In New Orleans | Musicraft | 312 | February 17, 1944 | 5128 5132 | |
| 1946 | Bill Brady Pretty Flowers in Your Back Yard | Musicraft | 313 | February 17, 1944 | 5127 5131 | |
| 1946 | Easy Rider Pigmeat | Disc | 5501 | June 1946 | | |
| 1947 | Sweet Mary Blues Grasshopers in My Pillow | Capitol | A40038 | October 27, 1944 | 459-2A 460-3A | |
| 1948 | Irene Backwater Blues | Capitol | 40130 | October 11, 1944 | 413-3A 416-3A | |
| 1948 | Digging My Potatoes Defense Blues | Disc | 5085 | June 1946 | D-385 D-386 | |

=== Albums ===
| Release year | Title | Label | Catalog Number | Notes |
|---|---|---|---|---|
| 1939 | Negro Sinful Songs | Musicraft | Album 31 | |
| 1940 | The Midnight Special and Other Southern Prison Songs | Victor | P-50 | |
| 1941 | Play Parties in Song and Dance | Asch | | |
| 1942 | Work Songs of the U.S.A. | Asch | | |
| 1944 | Songs by Lead Belly | Asch | A-343 | |
| 1946 | Negro Folk Songs | Disc | 660 | |
| 1947 | Midnight Special | Disc | 726 | Featuring Woody Guthrie and Cisco Houston |

== Posthumous discography ==
=== The Library of Congress recordings ===
The Library of Congress recordings, made by John and Alan Lomax from 1934 to 1943, were released in a six-volume series by Rounder Records:

- Midnight Special (1991)
- Gwine Dig a Hole to Put the Devil In (1991)
- Let It Shine on Me (1991)
- The Titanic (1994)
- Nobody Knows the Trouble I've Seen (1994)
- Go Down Old Hannah (1995)

=== Folkways recordings ===
The Folkways recordings, done for Moses Asch from 1941 to 1947, were released in a three-volume series by Smithsonian Folkways:

- Where Did You Sleep Last Night, Lead Belly Legacy, Vol. 1 (1996)
- Bourgeois Blues, Lead Belly Legacy, Vol. 2 (1997)
- Shout On, Lead Belly Legacy, Vol. 3 (1998)

Smithsonian Folkways has released several other collections of his recordings:

- Leadbelly Sings Folk Songs (1989)
- Lead Belly's Last Sessions (4-CD box set, 1994), recorded late 1948 in New York City; his only commercial recordings on magnetic tape
- Lead Belly Sings for Children (1999)
- Folkways: The Original Vision, Woody Guthrie and Lead Belly (2004), expanded version of the 1989 compilation
- Lead Belly: The Smithsonian Folkways Collection (2015)

=== Live recordings ===
- Leadbelly Recorded in Concert, University of Texas, Austin, June 15, 1949 (1973, Playboy Records PB 119)
- "The King of the Twelve-String Guitar is a Regular on WNYC Through the 1940s" Extant Lead Belly WNYC broadcasts 1940–1949.

=== Other compilations ===
- A Leadbelly Memorial, Vol II (1963, Stinson Records, SLP 19), red vinyl pressing
- Alabama Bound (1989, RCA Heritage Series), a 16 track CD manufactured for BMG Direct Marketing
- Huddie Ledbetter's Best (1989, BGO Records), containing recordings made for Capitol Records in 1944 in California
- King of the 12-String Guitar (1991, Sony/Legacy Records), a collection of blues songs and prison ballads recorded in 1935 in New York City for the American Record Corporation, including previously unreleased alternate takes
- Lead Belly Sings and Plays (1962, Stinson Records, SLPS 91), red vinyl pressing
- Private Party November 21, 1948 (2000, Document Records), containing Lead Belly's intimate performance at a private party in late 1948 in Minneapolis
- Take This Hammer, When the Sun Goes Down series, vol. 5 (2003, RCA Victor/Bluebird Jazz), CD collection of all 26 songs Lead Belly recorded for Victor Records in 1940, half of which feature the Golden Gate Jubilee Quartet (a 1968 LP released by RCA Victor included about half of these recordings)
- The Definitive Lead Belly (2008, Not Now Music), a 50-song retrospective on two CDs
- Leadbelly – American Folk & Blues Anthology (2013, Not Now Music), 75 songs on three CDs
- American Epic: The Best of Lead Belly (2017, Lo-Max, Sony Legacy, Third Man)

== Sources ==
- White, Gary; Stuart, David; Aviva, Elyn (2001). Music in Our World. p. 196. ISBN 0-07-027212-3.
- Wolfe, Charles; Lornell, Kip (1992). The Life and Legend of Leadbelly . New York City: HarperCollins Publishers. ISBN 0060168625
