= Cisco Houston =

American musician (1918–1961)

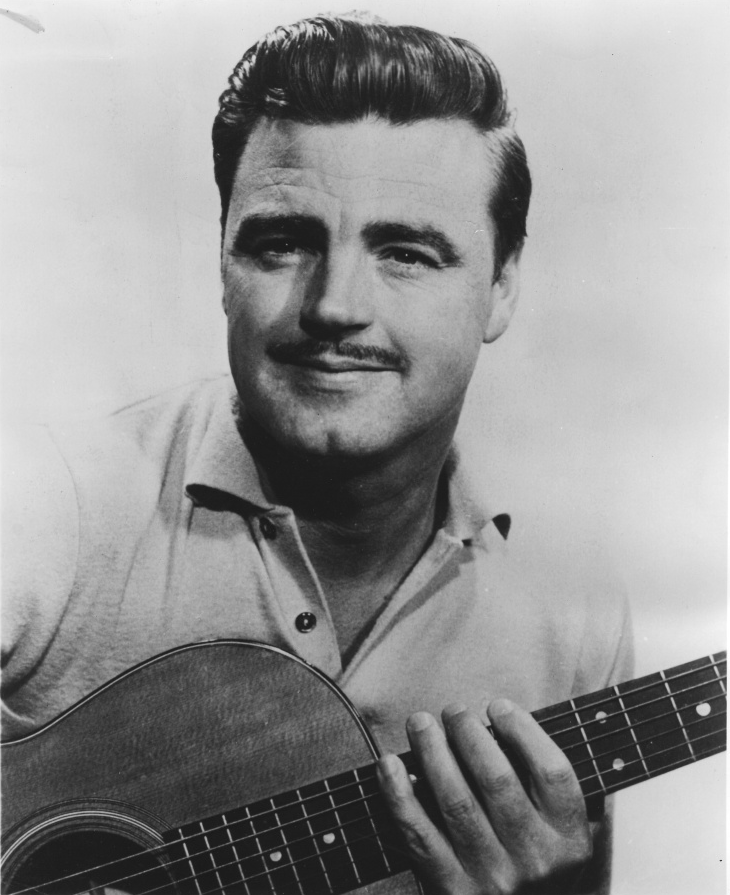

Background information
- Born: Gilbert Vandine Houston; August 18, 1918; Wilmington, Delaware, U.S.
- Died: April 29, 1961 (aged 42) San Bernardino, California, U.S.
- Genre: Folk
- Occupation: Singer-songwriter
- Instruments: Guitar, voice
- Years active: 1930s–1960

Gilbert Vandine "Cisco" Houston (August 18, 1918 – April 29, 1961) was an American folk singer and songwriter, who is closely associated with Woody Guthrie due to their extensive history of traveling and recording together.

Houston was a regular recording artist for Moses Asch's Folkways recording studio. He performed with folk/blues musicians Lead Belly, Sonny Terry, the Almanac Singers, Cynthia Gooding and others.

== Biography ==
=== Early life ===
Gilbert Vandine Houston was born in Wilmington, Delaware, United States, on August 18, 1918, the second of four children. His father, Adrian Moncure Houston, was a sheet-metal worker. The family moved to California while Houston was still young, and he attended school in Eagle Rock, California, a suburb of Los Angeles.

During his school years, Houston began to play the guitar, having picked up an assortment of folk songs from his family. It is reported that Houston was regarded as highly intelligent during his time at school, despite the nystagmus that afflicted his eyesight, leaving him to rely heavily on peripheral vision. He learned primarily by memorizing what he heard in the classroom. Despite his difficulties, Houston came to be regarded as a well-read individual.

=== The Great Depression ===
When the Great Depression struck, Houston began working to help support his family. In 1932, his unemployed father left home and a few years later Gil went on the road, accompanied initially by his brother Slim. He spent years traveling and working odd jobs throughout the western United States, always with a guitar at his side. He passed through many places, including the town of Cisco, California, the place from which he took his name.

During his travels, Houston expanded his repertoire of traditional songs, particularly during his time as a cowboy. He performed music informally wherever he went, and eventually began occasionally playing at clubs and on radio stations in the West.

Houston returned to Los Angeles in 1938 and pursued a career in acting. During this time Houston, along with friend and fellow actor Will Geer, visited folk singer Woody Guthrie at a radio studio in Hollywood marking the beginning of the close friendship he and Guthrie had. The taciturn Houston proved an ideal counterpart for the hyperactive Woody, and the two men began traveling together, touring migrant worker camps, singing, and promoting unionism and workers' rights, eventually making their way to New York City.

=== World War II ===
Despite Houston's poor eyesight (which rendered him nearly blind by the end of his life), he was a member of the National Maritime Union and worked in the Merchant Marine starting in 1940 and continued through three years of World War II. Houston survived three separate torpedoing of ships on which he served. After the United States entered World War II, Woody Guthrie joined Houston as a Merchant Mariner along with Jim Longhi, who documented this period in a memoir titled, Woody, Cisco & Me. Throughout three wartime trips, the two folksingers gave performances regularly, boosting the morale of the crew and, on the third trip, three thousand troops.

=== Post–World War II ===
After the war, Houston returned to New York and performed with the Almanac Singers, a left-wing folk group that often included Pete Seeger, Lee Hays, Millard Lampell, and Woody Guthrie, among others. During those years following the war, Houston engaged in acting, music, and traveling, sometimes recording. In 1944 Houston, along with Woody Guthrie and Sonny Terry, had taken part in recording sessions at the studio of Moses Asch. Four years later, Asch founded the label Folkways, with Houston performing on two of the first LPs issued by the new company.

Houston appeared in the Broadway theatre play The Cradle Will Rock in 1948 and, in 1954, began hosting the Gil Houston radio show. The show was quickly cancelled, which led to some suspicion of blacklisting because of Houston's left-wing views.

Throughout the 1950s, Houston performed regularly at clubs, churches, and colleges. He recorded for various labels, including Folkways, Stinson, Disc, Coral, Decca and Vanguard, and was a guest on numerous radio and television programs.

Houston toured India in 1959 under the sponsorship of the State Department with Sonny Terry, Brownie McGhee, and Marilyn Child. In 1960, he hosted the television special, Folk Sound U.S.A. on CBS, and appeared later that year at the Newport Folk Festival. His recordings for Vanguard began with the album The Cisco Special, followed by a collection of Woody Guthrie songs.

=== Death and legacy ===
Diagnosed with terminal stomach cancer, Houston continued performing until he was no longer able. Less than two months before his death, he recorded a final album, Ain't Got No Home for Vanguard. He returned to California and died April 29, 1961, in San Bernardino.

In the months preceding his death, with the knowledge of his imminent demise, Houston talked at length with his old friend Lee Hays, who recorded their sessions for a project he dubbed The Cisco Tapes. Hays held onto the tapes for two more decades, until his own death in 1981, but never completed creating anything from the material.

Houston and Hays had previously revised an earlier song called "Bad Man's Blunder". The Kingston Trio, still at the height of their popularity in 1960, recorded it for their album String Along, because they "wanted to do something for this artist who had contributed so much to the folk movement, but had somehow failed to receive the commercial recognition one would expect for a talent of his magnitude. Houston received significant royalties from the success of this song at a time when the money was much needed."

Houston's death was mourned by a growing folk music community that included young songwriters including Bob Dylan, Tom Paxton, and Phil Ochs, a new generation of musicians who revered such performers as Woody Guthrie, Lead Belly, Sonny Terry, and Houston.

Song as tributes to, or with mentions of, Cisco Houston include:

- "Fare Thee Well, Cisco" by Tom Paxton
- "Cisco Houston Passed This Way" by Peter La Farge
- "Blues for Cisco Houston" by Tom McGrath
- "Song to Woody" by Bob Dylan
- "A Picture From Life's Other Side" by Ramblin' Jack Elliott
- "Christmas Time in Washington" by Steve Earle
- "Goodbye Josh" by Peter Yarrow
- "Never Tire of the Road" by Andy Irvine

== Music ==
Cisco Houston was distinguished by his voice, a smooth baritone sometimes considered too polished for folk music. His voice was criticized as being too good, too professional, and lacking in authenticity. Cisco responded to this accusation:

There's always a form of theater that things take; even back in the Ozarks, as far as you want to go. People gravitate to the best singer...We have people today who go just the other way, and I don't agree with them. Some of our folksong exponents seem to think you have to go way back in the hills and drag out the worst singer in the world before it's authentic. Now, this is nonsense...Just because he's old and got three arthritic fingers and two strings left on the banjo doesn't prove anything.

His repertoire included folk songs and traditional songs from different arenas of American life – cowboy songs, union songs, railroad songs, murder ballads, and more. He is also known for his renditions of Woody Guthrie originals.

Though not known as a songwriter, Houston did contribute some original tunes. These include "Great July Jones", written with Lewis Allen; "Crazy Heart"; "Ramblin' Gamblin' Man"; "Bad Man's Blunder", written with Lee Hays; "The Killer" (words traditional); "What did the deep blue sea say", and "Dollar Down". Some of his compositions were included in the songbook 900 Miles, the Ballads, Blues and Folksongs of Cisco Houston, issued by Oak Publications in 1965.

== Selected discography ==
For an in depth, illustrated discography, see https://www.wirz.de/music/houston.htm

- Cowboy Ballads and Railroad Songs (Folkways FA 2022) (1952)
- 900 Miles and Other R. R. Songs (Folkways FA 2013) (1954)
- More Songs By Woody Guthrie And Cisco Houston (Melodisc MLP12-106) (1955)
- Cisco Sings (Folkways FA 2346) (1958)
- Cisco Houston Sings Songs of the Open Road (Folkways FA 2480) (1960)
- Sings the Songs of Woody Guthrie (Vanguard VRS 9089) (1960)
- I Ain't Got No Home (Vanguard VRS-9107) (1962)
- Nursery Rhymes, Games & Folk Songs (Folkways FC 7606) (1963)

== Bibliography ==
- Baggelaar, Kristin; Milton, Donald (1976). Folk Music: More Than a Song (1st ed.). U.S.A.: Thomas Y. Crowell. ISBN 978-0-690-01159-3.
- Houston, Cisco; Asch, Moses; Silber, Irwin, eds. (1965). 900 Miles: The Ballads, Blues and Folksongs of Cisco Houston (1st ed.). New York: Oak Publications. ISBN 978-0-825-60047-0.
- Klein, Joe (1980). Woody Guthrie: A Life (1st ed.). U.S.A.: Knopf. ISBN 978-0-394-50152-9.
- Longhi, Jim (1997). Woody, Cisco, and Me: Seamen Three in the Merchant Marine (1st ed.). U.S.A.: University of Illinois Press. ISBN 978-0-252-02276-0.
- Stambler, Irwin; Landon, Grelun (1969). Encyclopedia of Folk, Country, and Western Music (1st ed.). U.S.A.: Griffin Books / St. Martin's Press. ISBN 978-0-860-66003-3.
- Willens, Doris (1988). Lonesome Traveler: The Life of Lee Hays (1st ed.). U.S.A.: W. W. Norton & Co. Inc. ISBN 978-0-393-02564-4.
