= Moses Asch =

American record producer (1905–1986)

Moe Asch
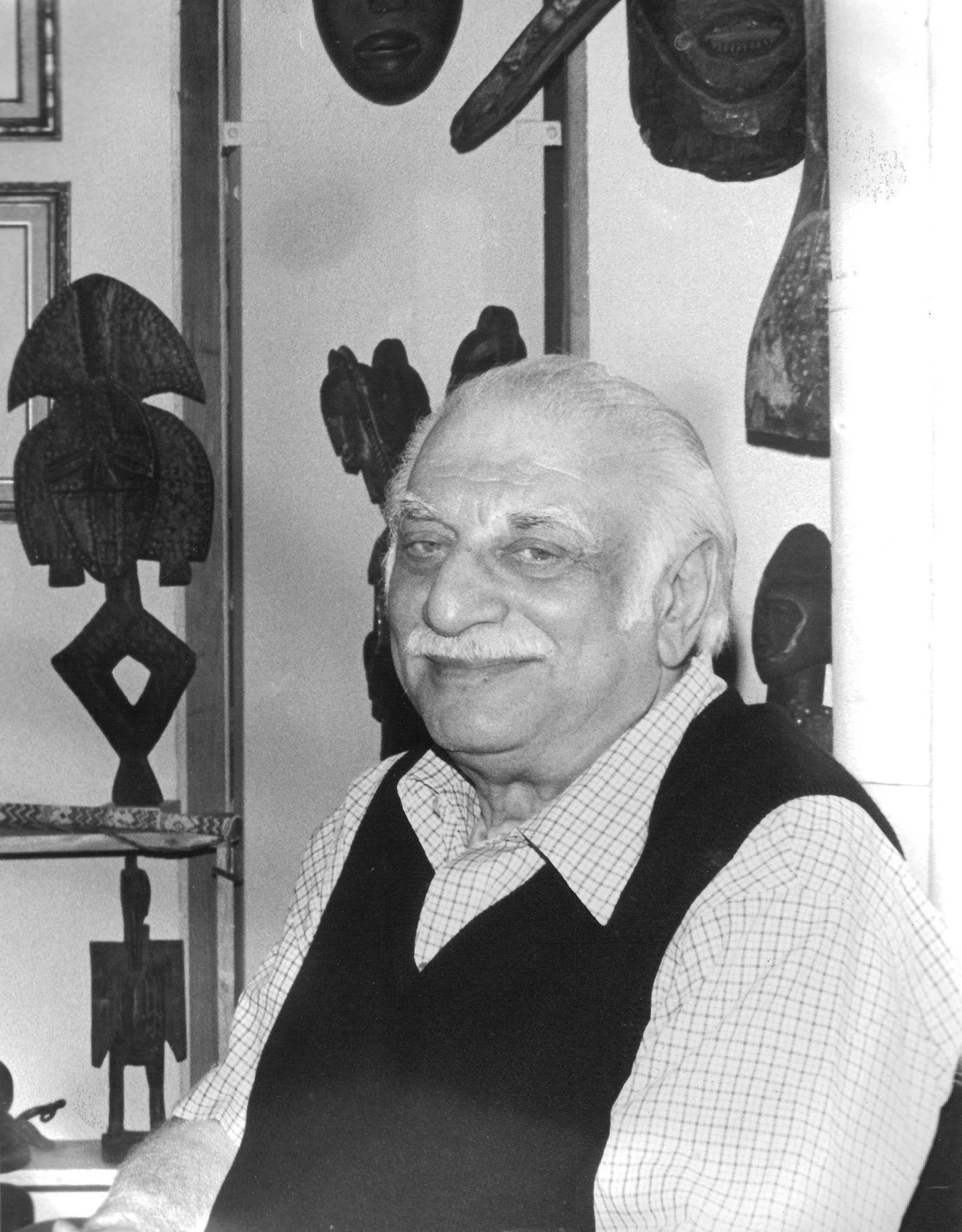
- Moses Asch in his Folkways Records Office in New York
- Born: Moses Asch; December 2, 1905; Warsaw, Congress Poland, Russian Empire
- Died: October 19, 1986 (aged 80); New York City, US
- Occupations: Record executive Record engineer
- Known for: Folkways Records
- Children: Michael Asch
- Parent: Sholem Asch

Moses Asch (December 2, 1905 – October 19, 1986) was an American recording engineer and record executive. He founded Asch Records, which then changed its name to Folkways Records when the label transitioned from 78 RPM recordings to LP records. Asch ran the Folkways label from 1948 until his death in 1986. Folkways was influential in bringing folk music into the American cultural mainstream. Some of America's greatest folk songs were originally recorded for Asch, including "This Land Is Your Land" by Woody Guthrie and "Goodnight Irene" by Lead Belly. Asch sold many commercial recordings to Verve Records; after his death, Asch's archive of ethnic recordings was acquired by the Smithsonian Institution, and released as Smithsonian Folkways Records.

== Early life and education ==
Moses Asch was born in Warsaw, Poland, the son of Yiddish language novelist and dramatist Sholem Asch, and the younger brother of novelist Nathan Asch.

In 1912, the Asch family left Poland, on account of antisemitism, and settled in a suburb of Paris. In 1915, as war engulfed France, the family emigrated to New York. After the war, Asch studied electronics at a technical Hochschule in Koblenz, Germany. He returned to New York to commence work as an audio engineer.

== Career ==
In 1938, Asch's father's employer, The Jewish Daily Forward, commissioned the firm where Moses Asch worked to build a transmitter for its Yiddish-language radio station, WEVD. Asch thereafter explored the market for recorded Yiddish music, both sacred and secular. In 1940, Asch established Asch Recordings, and concentrated on publishing and selling phonograph records. Asch overextended his operations, however, and went bankrupt in 1948.

Asch was able to resurrect his recording career in 1948 by having his secretary, Marian Distler, initiate a new record company, Folkways Records, in her name. Harold Courlander worked for Asch as editor at the time and is credited with coming up with the name "Folkways" for the label. Although in theory a "consultant" to Folkways in its early years, Asch ran the company from its formation until his death. He recorded and published LP records by such famous folk and blues singers as Woody Guthrie, Lead Belly, Pete Seeger, Cisco Houston, and Ella Jenkins.

Asch published American, African, Asian and European folk music from a range of cultures, such as the LPs Religious Folk Music of India, Sounds and Dances of Haiti, Folk Music of Ethiopia, The Old Folksongs of Vermont, and The Folk Music of France. Asch also issued Negro slave spirituals, such as the Negro Folk Music of Alabama, originally collected in 1952 by Harold Courlander who was an associate of Asch, and Negro Folk Songs redone by the Folk Masters, an African American band in 1952, as well Mormon Folk Songs and Yiddish, Ladino, and Hebrew-Aramaic, Cantorial synagogue music from the 1940s, including a rare pre-Holocaust liturgy from Moshe Koussevitzky.

In 1952, filmmaker and ethnomusicologist Harry Smith compiled for Asch the Anthology of American Folk Music, a collection of indigenous Southern and Midwestern US folk songs, which was the first record to conscientiously not differentiate between black and white folk singers upon Smith's request.

Smith said of Asch in an interview on WBAI New York radio's "The Sing Out! Radio Show" (and repeated the story in an interview with John Cohen in Sing Out! magazine), that he had shipped the most precious records in his collection from San Francisco to Asch in New York. Asch initially refused to pay the COD charges for the package. Only after days of cajoling, did Asch pay the COD charges. As it turned out, the Anthology became "the most important collection of its type", according to Asch.

Asch had a significant recording relationship with James P. Johnson, described as the Father of Stride Piano. Johnson made a significant series of recordings for several labels controlled by Asch, including Asch, Stinson, Disc, and Folkways. On the Stinson album, New York Jazz, Johnson recorded five numbers which he stated could be heard in New York in the 1910s, in addition to the first recorded piano solo of Scott Joplin's, Euphonic Sounds. This established the link between the stride piano of Johnson, and the ragtime of Joplin, from which stride is descended.

One principle behind Asch's direction of the Folkways label was that he never deleted a single title from the Folkways catalogue. Asch said, "Just because the letter J is less popular than the letter S, you don't take it out of the dictionary." After his death, the Folkways recordings were acquired by the Smithsonian Institution, and Asch stipulated in his will that no titles were to be deleted, and that unreleased master tapes in the Folkways archive should be explored. The Smithsonian acquisition of the Folkways archive was, in part, funded by the release of the album A Vision Shared: A Tribute to Woody Guthrie and Leadbelly, which featured contributions by Pete Seeger, Bob Dylan, Bruce Springsteen, U2 and other artists.

Folk Singer Dave Van Ronk said: "Moe Asch could be an exasperating man, and he would never pay you ten cents if he could get away with five, but he really loved the music." Neil Alan Marks wrote in The New York Times in 1980: "Folkways Records was for folklorists and musicians the talmudic source for much primary material. Its founder, Moses Asch, may have more to do with the preservation of folk music than any single person in this country."

Anthropologist Michael Asch is his son.
