= Protest songs in the United States =

Musical tradition

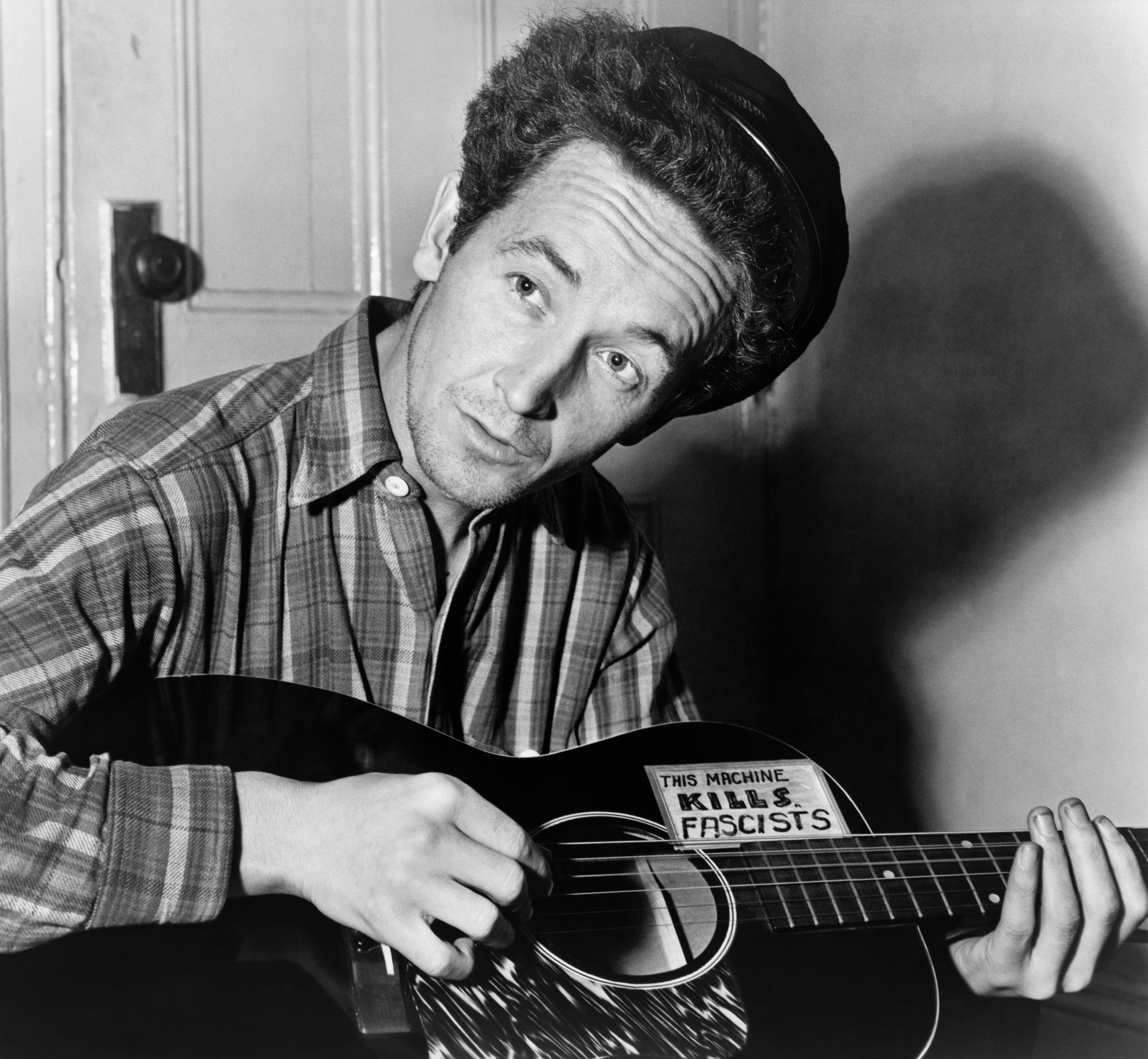
Woody Guthrie, an American singer-songwriter and folk musician well known for his protest songs.

Protest songs in the United States are a tradition that date back to the early 18th century and have persisted and evolved as an aspect of American culture through the present day. Many American social movements have inspired protest songs spanning a variety of musical genres including but not limited to rap, folk, rock, and pop music. Though early 18th century songs stemmed from the American colonial period as well as in response to the Revolutionary war, protest songs have and continue to cover a wide variety of subjects. Protest songs typically serve to address some social, political, or economic concern through the means of musical composition. In the 19th century, American protest songs focused heavily on topics including slavery, poverty, and the Civil War while the 20th century saw an increased popularity in songs pertaining to women's rights, economic injustice, current politics, and war. In the 21st century, popular protest songs have addressed topics such as police brutality and racism.

== History ==
=== Nineteenth century ===
19th-century protest songs dealt, for the most part, with three key issues: war, and the Civil War in particular (such as "When Johnny Comes Marching Home"); the abolition of slavery ("Song of the Abolitionist" "No More Auction Block for Me", "Oh Freedom", and "Sometimes I Feel Like a Motherless Child", among others); and women's suffrage, both for and against in both Britain and the U.S.

Hutchinson Family Singers were one of the protest voices in America at the time. From 1839, the Hutchinson Family Singers became well known for their songs supporting abolition. They sang at the White House for President John Tyler, and befriended Abraham Lincoln. Their subject matter touched on relevant social issues such as abolition, the temperance movement, politics, war and women's suffrage. Much of their music focused on idealism, social reform, equal rights, moral improvement, community activism and patriotism.

The Hutchinsons' career spanned the major social and political events of the mid-19th century, including the Civil War. The Hutchinson Family Singers established an impressive musical legacy and are considered to be the forerunners of the great protest singer-songwriters and folk groups of the 1950s and 60s, such as Woody Guthrie and Bob Dylan.

Many Negro spirituals have been interpreted as thinly veiled expressions of protest against slavery and oppression. For example, "Oh, Freedom" and "Go Down Moses" draw implicit comparisons between the plight of enslaved African Americans and that of enslaved Hebrews in the Bible. These spiritual songs antedated the Civil War but were collected and widely disseminated only after the ratification of the Thirteenth Amendment to the United States Constitution in 1865. The first collection of African-American spirituals appeared in Thomas Wentworth Higginson's book Army Life in a Black Regiment, which was published in 1870, but collected in 1862–64 while Higginson was serving as a colonel of the First South Carolina Volunteers, the first regiment recruited from former slaves for the Federal service. (Secretary of War Edwin McMasters Stanton required that black regiments be commanded by white officers.)

A fervent abolitionist, Transcendentalist critic, and poetry lover, who was a friend and enthusiastic champion of American poet Emily Dickinson, Higginson had been deeply impressed by the beauty of the devotional songs he heard the soldiers singing around the regiment's campfires. Higginson wrote down the texts, in dialect, as he heard them, but failed to provide tunes. The second influential book about African-American spirituals was the 1872 collection Jubilee Songs as Sung by the Jubilee Singers of Fisk University, by Thomas F. Steward, comprising songs sung by students of Fisk University on their fund-raising tours throughout the county, arranged and harmonized according to 19th-century classical music conventions.

One of the most well known African-American spirituals is the anthem "Lift Every Voice and Sing". Originally written as a poem by African-American novelist and composer James Weldon Johnson (1871–1938), it was set to music in 1900 by his brother John Rosamond Johnson (1873–1954) in 1900 and first performed in Jacksonville, Florida as part of a celebration of Lincoln's birthday on February 12, 1900, by a choir of 500 schoolchildren at the segregated Stanton School, where James Weldon Johnson was principal. In 1919, the NAACP adopted the song as "The Negro National Anthem". This song contained strong appeals to the ideals of justice and equality, and singing it could be interpreted as an act of grass-roots self-assertion by people who were officially still barred from speaking out too overtly against Jim Crow and the resurgence of Ku Klux Klan activity in the 1920s.

A topical parlor song that is arguably a precursor of environmental movements is an 1837 musical setting of "Woodman, Spare That Tree!" The text is from a poem by George Pope Morris, founder of the New York Mirror and published in that paper, set to music composed by British-born composer Henry Russell. Verses include: "That old familiar tree, / Whose glory and renown / Are spread o'er land and sea / And wouldst thou hack it down? / Woodman, forbear thy stroke! / Cut not its earth, bound ties; / Oh! spare that ag-ed oak / Now towering to the skies!" This song has never caught on as a movement song, however

=== Twentieth century ===
In the 20th century, the union movement, the Great Depression, the Civil Rights Movement, and the war in Vietnam (see Vietnam War protests) all inspired protest songs.

==== 1900–1920; labor movement, class struggle, and the great war ====
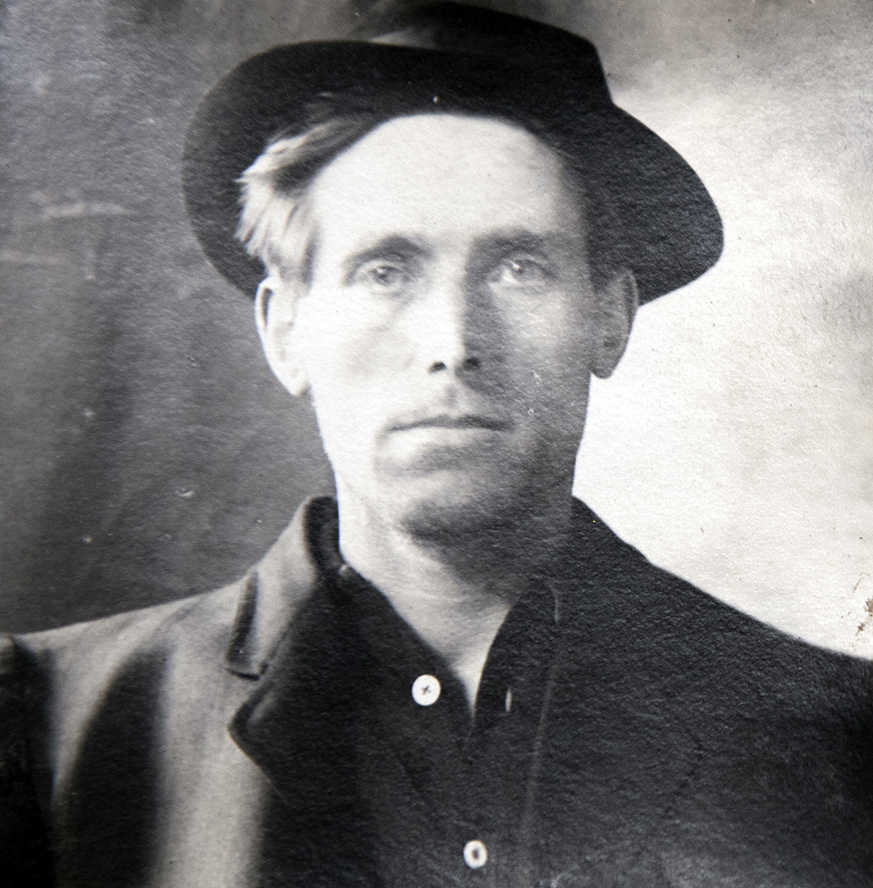
Joe Hill, one of the pioneering protest singers of the early 20th century

The vast majority of American protest music from the first half of the 20th century was based on the struggle for fair wages and working hours for the working class, and on the attempt to unionize the American workforce towards those ends. The Industrial Workers of the World (IWW) was founded in Chicago in June 1905 at a convention of two hundred socialists, anarchists, and radical trade unionists from all over the United States who were opposed to the policies of the American Federation of Labor. From the start they used music as a powerful form of protest.

One of the most famous of these early 20th century "Wobblies" was Joe Hill, an IWW activist who traveled widely, organizing workers and writing and singing political songs. He coined the phrase "pie in the sky", which appeared in his most famous protest song "The Preacher and the Slave" (1911). The song calls for "Workingmen of all countries, unite / Side by side we for freedom will fight / When the world and its wealth we have gained / To the grafters we'll sing this refrain." Other notable protest songs written by Hill include "The Tramp", "There Is Power in a Union", "Rebel Girl", and "Casey Jones—Union Scab".

Another known song of this period was "Bread and Roses", by James Oppenheim and Caroline Kohlsaat, which was sung in protest en masse at a textile strike in Lawrence, Massachusetts, during January–March 1912 (now often referred to as the "Bread and Roses strike") and has been subsequently taken up by protest movements throughout the 20th century.

The advent of World War I (1914–1918) resulted in a great number of songs against the war in general, and specifically in America against the U.S.'s decision to enter the European war. One of the successful protest songs to capture the widespread American skepticism about joining in the European war was "I Didn't Raise My Boy to Be a Soldier", (1915) by lyricist Alfred Bryan and composer Al Piantadosi. Many of these war-time protest songs took the point of view of the family at home, worried about their father/husband fighting overseas. One such song of the period which dealt with the children who had been orphaned by the war was "War Babies", from 1916, with music composed by James F. Hanley and lyrics written by Ballard MacDonald, which spoke to the need for taking care of orphans of war in an unusually frank and open manner. For a typical song written from a child's point-of-view, see Jean Schwartz (music), Sam M. Lewis & Joe Young (lyrics) and their song "Hello Central! Give Me No Man's Land" (1918), in which a young boy tries to call his father in No Man's Land on the telephone (then a recent invention), unaware that he has been killed in combat.

==== 1920s–1930s; the great depression and racial discrimination ====
The 1920s and 30s also saw the continuing growth of the union and labor movements (the IWW claimed at its peak in 1923 some 100,000 members), as well as widespread poverty due to the Great Depression and the Dust Bowl, which inspired musicians and singers to decry the harsh realities which they saw all around them. It was against this background that folk singer Aunt Molly Jackson was singing songs with striking Harlan coal miners in Kentucky in 1931, and writing protest songs such as "Hungry Ragged Blues" and "Poor Miner's Farewell", which depicted the struggle for social justice in a Depression-ravaged America. In New York City, Marc Blitzstein's opera/musical The Cradle Will Rock, a pro-union musical directed by Orson Welles, was produced in 1937. However, it proved to be so controversial that it was shut down for fear of social unrest. Undeterred, the IWW increasingly used music to protest working conditions in the United States and to recruit new members to their cause.

The 1920s and 30s also saw a marked rise in the number of songs which protested against racial discrimination, such as Fats Waller's "(What Did I Do to Be So) Black and Blue" in 1929, and the anti-lynching song "Strange Fruit" by Lewis Allan and performed and recorded by Billie Holiday, which contains the lyrics "Southern trees bear strange fruit / Blood on the leaves and blood at the root / Black bodies swinging in the southern breeze". It was also during this period that many African American blues singers were beginning to have their voices heard on a larger scale across America through their music, most of which protested the discrimination which they faced on a daily basis. Perhaps the most famous example of these 1930s blues protest songs is Lead Belly's "The Bourgeois Blues", in which he sings, "The home of the Brave / The land of the Free / I don't wanna be mistreated by no bourgeoisie."

==== 1940s–1950s; The labor movement vs McCarthyism; anti-nuclear songs ====
The 1940s and 1950s saw the rise of music that continued to protest labor, race, and class issues. Protest songs continued to increase their profile over this period, and a rising number of artists appeared who were to have an enduring influence on the protest music genre. However, the movement and its protest singers faced increasing opposition from McCarthyism. One of the most notable pro-union protest singers of the period was Woody Guthrie ("This Land Is Your Land", "Deportee", "1913 Massacre", "Dust Bowl Blues", "Tom Joad"), whose guitar bore a sticker which read: "This Machine Kills Fascists". Guthrie was also an occasional member of the hugely influential labor-movement band The Almanac Singers, founded by Millard Lampell, Lee Hays, and Pete Seeger, which had a floating personnel. Politics and music were closely intertwined with the Almanac's Popular Front political beliefs. Their first release in May 1941, an album called Songs For John Doe, performed by Seeger, Hays, Lampell, Josh White, and Sam Gary, urged non-intervention in World War II and opposed the peacetime draft and unequal treatment of African-American draftees. A month after it was issued, Hitler invaded the Soviet Union and Roosevelt issued an order banning racial and religious discrimination in defense hiring. The Almanacs immediately switched to a pro-war position and the Songs for John Doe album was withdrawn and all copies destroyed. Their second album, Talking Union, was a collection six labor songs: "Union Maid", "I Don't Want Your Millions Mister", "Get Thee Behind Me Satan", "Union Train", "Which Side Are You On?", and, of course, the eponymous "Talking Union", sung by Guthrie, who had joined the group in July. This album, issued in July 1941, was not anti-Roosevelt. After the Japanese bombed Pearl Harbor in December of that year, the Almanacs issued a strongly pro-war, pro-Roosevelt album, Dear Mr. President, that included Guthrie's "Reuben James" (1942), and several of them enlisted in the Army (Seeger) or Merchant Marine (Guthrie and Cisco Houston). The Almanacs were widely criticized in the press for switching positions, especially by Dr. Carl Joachim Friedrich, a Harvard political scientist who was in charge of military propaganda for domestic consumption and wrote prolifically for popular magazines.

In 1948 Hays and Seeger organized a quartet, which also included a young Ronnie Gilbert and Fred Hellerman, to accompany international folk dancing to raise money for their organization People's Songs. Initially known as the No Name Quartet, by 1950 it was enjoying great popular success as The Weavers. Several of the Weavers most popular songs, such as "If I Had a Hammer", were protest songs or implicitly supported Israel (Tzena, Tzena, Tzena), although the political content was not explicit. Although some in the left wing press derided them as having sold out their beliefs in exchange for popular success, their fans nevertheless recognized what their songs were about because their international and multi-racial repertoire strongly suggested support for racial justice and world peace. Because of the Red Scare and McCarthyism, the Weavers' managers directed them to avoid appearing at progressive venues and prohibited them from performing or recording songs with political content. Former Almanac members Seeger and Hays were listed in the publication Red Channels and a former Communist who had worked at People's Songs, Harvey Matusow denounced the group as Communist Party members (he later recanted and admitted that he had lied). Although their manager went to the Red Channels office in person and with promises that the group would avoid trouble, they were placed under FBI surveillance and blacklisted by the entertainment industry during the McCarthyism era. Right-wing and anti-Communist groups protested at their performances and harassed promoters. As a result, a planned Weavers television appearance was canceled, they lost radio airplay (and royalties), and Decca Records terminated their recording contract. Because of its New Deal and popular front associations, folk music itself was under a cloud as potentially subversive, regardless of content, and disappeared from the mass media.

For the remainder of the 1950s, Seeger continued to appear at camps and schools and to write songs and pro-labor union and anti-war editorials, which appeared in his column in the folk music magazine Sing Out! under the pen name of "Johnny Appleseed". The Weavers were temporarily silenced but returned to sing before a rapturous crowd of fans in a reunion concert at Carnegie Hall in 1955. Issued in 1957, the album documenting this concert, The Weavers at Carnegie Hall, became a highly influential best-selling LP album. A second Weavers LP, Folk Songs Around the World, issued in 1959, was limited to traditional songs and spirituals.

Paul Robeson, singer, actor, athlete, and civil rights activist, was investigated by the FBI and was called before the House Un-American Activities Committee (HUAC) for his outspoken political views. The State Department denied Robeson a passport and issued a "stop notice" at all ports, effectively confining him to the United States. In a symbolic act of defiance against the travel ban, labor unions in the U.S. and Canada organized a concert at the International Peace Arch on the border between Washington state and the Canadian province of British Columbia on May 18, 1952. Robeson stood on the back of a flat bed truck on the American side of the U.S.-Canada border and performed a concert for a crowd on the Canadian side, variously estimated at between 20,000 and 40,000 people. Robeson returned to perform a second concert at the Peace Arch in 1953, and over the next two years two further concerts were scheduled.

In the 1940s, one of the leading musical voices of protest from the African American community in America was Josh White, one of the first musicians to make a name for himself singing political blues. White enjoyed a position of political privilege, especially as a black musician, as he established a long and close relationship with the family of Franklin and Eleanor Roosevelt, and would become the closest African American confidant to the President of the United States. He made his first foray into protest music and political blues with his highly controversial Columbia Records album Joshua White & His Carolinians: Chain Gang, produced by John H. Hammond, which included the song "Trouble", which summarised the plight of many African Americans in its opening line of "Well, I always been in trouble, 'cause I'm a black-skinned man." The album was the first race record ever forced upon the white radio stations and record stores in America's South and caused such a furor that it reached the desk of President Roosevelt. On December 20, 1940, White and the Golden Gate Quartet, sponsored by Eleanor Roosevelt, performed in a historic Washington, D.C. concert at the Library of Congress's Coolidge Auditorium to celebrate the 75th Anniversary of the Thirteenth Amendment to the Constitution of the United States, which abolished slavery. In January 1941, White performed at the President's Inauguration, and two months later he released another highly controversial record album, Southern Exposure, which included six anti-segregationist songs with liner notes written by the celebrated and equally controversial African American writer Richard Wright, and whose sub-title was "An Album of Jim Crow Blues". Like the Chain Gang album, and with revelatory yet inflammatory songs such as "Uncle Sam Says", "Jim Crown Train", "Bad Housing Blues", "Defense Factory Blues", "Southern Exposure", and "Hard Time Blues", it also was forced upon the southern white radio stations and record stores, caused outrage in the South and also was brought to the attention of President Roosevelt. A month later, White sang as a member of the Almanac Singers on their much criticized anti peace-time draft album, Songs for John Doe. Despite this, however, and White's membership in the Almanac Singers, instead of making White persona non grata in segregated America, resulted in President Roosevelt asking White to become the first African American artist to give a White House Command Performance, in 1941, for the Roosevelts were great fans of folk music.

After the atomic bombings of Hiroshima and Nagasaki on August 6 and 9, 1945, many people the world over feared nuclear warfare, and many protest songs were written against this new danger. The most immediately successful of these post-war anti-nuclear protest songs was Vern Partlow's "Old Man Atom" (1945) (also known by the alternate titles "Atomic Talking Blues" and "Talking Atom"). The song treats its subject in comic-serious fashion, with a combination of black humour puns (such as "We hold these truths to be self-evident / All men may be cremated equal" or "I don't mean the Adam that Mother Eve mated / I mean that thing that science liberated") on serious statements on the choices to be made in the nuclear age ("The people of the world must pick out a thesis / "Peace in the world, or the world in pieces!""). Folk singer Sam Hinton recorded "Old Man Atom" in 1950 for ABC Eagle, a small California independent label. Influential New York disc jockey Martin Block played Hinton's record on his "Make Believe Ballroom". Overwhelming listener response prompted Columbia Records to acquire the rights for national distribution. From all indications, it promised to be one of the year's biggest novelty records. RCA Victor rush-released a cover version by the Sons of the Pioneers. Country singer Ozzie Waters recorded the song for Decca's Coral subsidiary. Fred Hellerman – then contracted to Decca as a member of the Weavers – recorded it for Jubilee under the pseudonym "Bob Hill". Bing Crosby was reportedly ready to record "Old Man Atom" for Decca when a right-wing "committee" headed by Bronx, N.Y., Rabbi Benjamin Schultz and closely associated with the publications Red Channels and Counterattack, began attacking Columbia and RCA Victor for releasing a song that Schultz alleged reflected Communist ideology. According to a New York Times report on September 1, 1950:

Rabbi Benjamin Schultz, national director of the Joint Committee Against Communism, conceded last night that members of his committee, acting as individuals, had made known their feelings of opposition to the song to the recording companies. Those who protested against the song's issuance on records insisted that it parroted the Communist line on peace and reflected the propaganda for the Stockholm "peace petition." Mr. Partlow said yesterday, according to an Associated Press dispatch from Los Angeles, that his song was "not part of the Stockholm or any other so-called peace offensive." He added, "It was written five years ago long before any of these peace offensives."

Buckling under, both Columbia and RCA Victor withdrew "Old Man Atom" from distribution. Henceforth, mainstream pop music would avoid songs that mentioned potentially controversial topics until the folk revival of the 1960s. Other anti-nuclear protest songs of the immediate post-war period had included "Atom and Evil" (1946) by the Golden Gate Quartet, ("If Atom and Evil should ever be wed, / Lord, then darn if all of us are going to be dead.") and "Atomic Sermon" (1953) by Billy Hughes and his Rhythm Buckeroos.

==== 1960s: The civil rights movement, Vietnam war, and peace and revolution ====
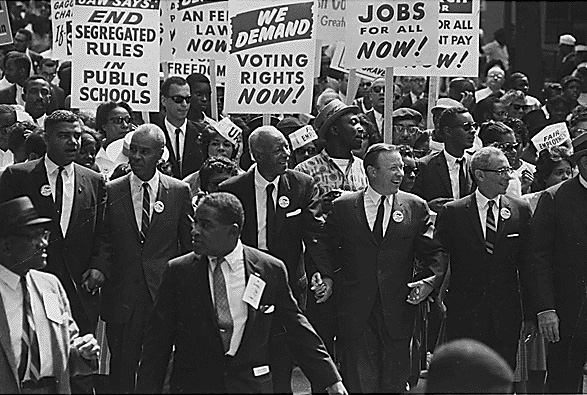
The March on Washington for Jobs and Freedom leaders marching from the Washington Monument to the Lincoln Memorial, August 28, 1963.

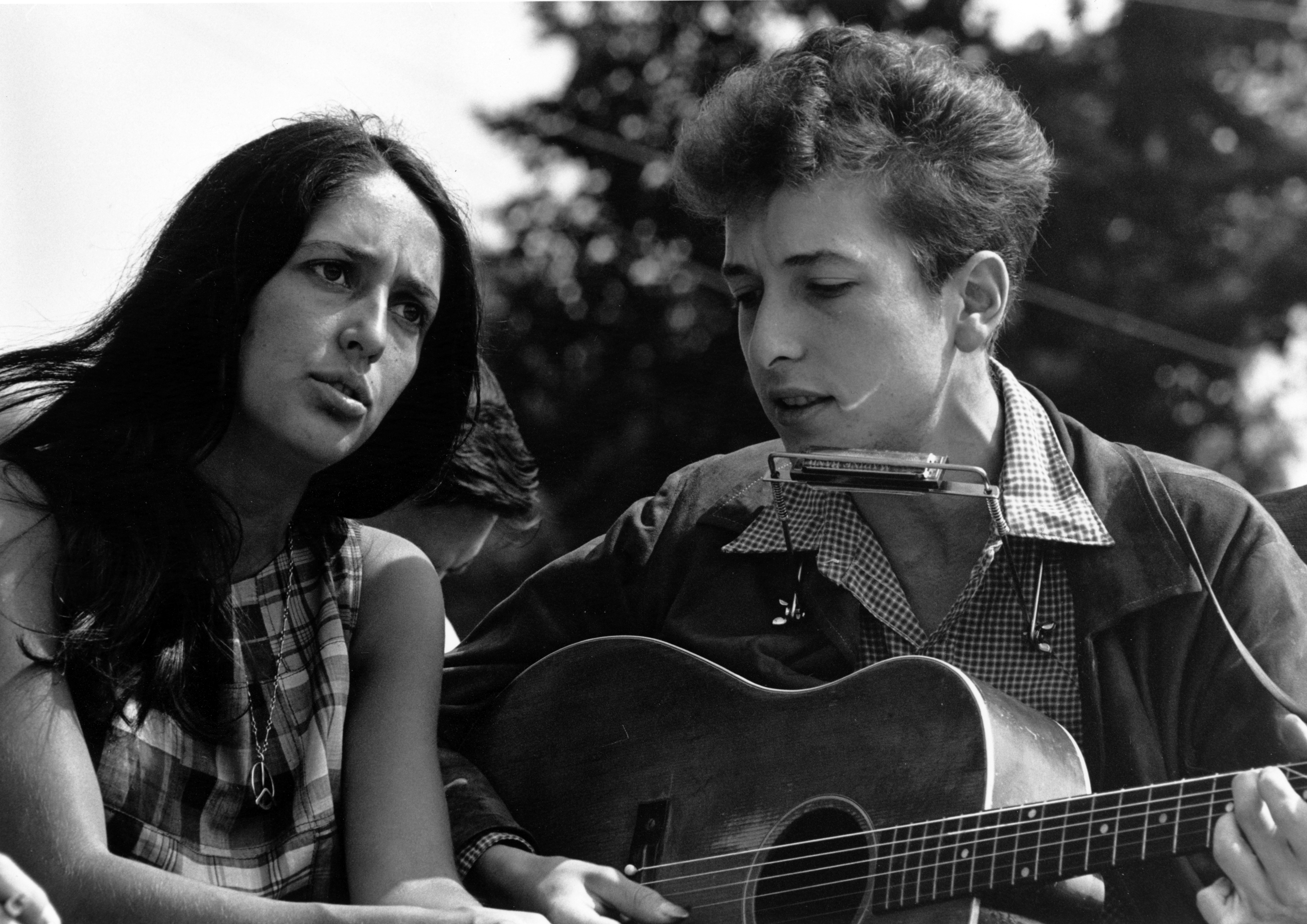
Bob Dylan with Joan Baez during the March on Washington in Washington, D.C., 1963

The 1960s was a fertile era for the genre, especially with the rise of the Civil Rights Movement, the ascendency of counterculture groups such as "hippies" and the New Left, and the escalation of the War in Vietnam. The protest songs of the period differed from those of earlier leftist movements, which had been more oriented towards labor activism and adopting instead a broader definition of political activism commonly called social activism, which incorporated notions of equal rights and of promoting the concept of "peace". The music often included relatively simple instrumental accompaniment, including acoustic guitar and harmonica. Many Americans still remember Odetta Holmes performance at the 1963 civil rights movement's March on Washington where she sang "Oh Freedom".

One of the key figures of the 1960s protest movement was Bob Dylan, who produced a number of landmark protest songs, such as "Blowin' in the Wind" (1962), "Masters of War" (1963), "Talking World War III Blues" (1963), and "The Times They Are A-Changin'" (1964). While Dylan is often thought of as a 'protest singer', most of his protest songs spring from a relatively short time-period in his career; Mike Marqusee writes:

The protest songs that made Dylan famous and with which he continues to be associated were written in a brief period of some 20 months – from January 1962 to November 1963. Influenced by American radical traditions (the Wobblies, the Popular Front of the thirties and forties, the Beat anarchists of the fifties) and above all by the political ferment touched off among young people by the civil rights and ban the bomb movements, he engaged in his songs with the terror of the nuclear arms race, with poverty, racism and prison, jingoism and war.

Dylan often sang against injustice, such as the murders of Emmett Till in The Death Of Emmett Till (1962) and Civil Rights Movement activist Medgar Evers in "Only a Pawn in Their Game" (1964), or the killing of the 51-year-old African American barmaid Hattie Carroll by the wealthy young tobacco farmer from Charles County, William Devereux "Billy" Zantzinger in "The Lonesome Death of Hattie Carroll" (1964) (Zantzinger was sentenced to six months in a county jail for the murder). Many of the injustices about which Dylan sang were not even based on race or civil rights issues, but rather everyday injustices and tragedies, such as the death of boxer Davey Moore in the ring ("Who Killed Davey Moore?" (1964)), or the breakdown of farming and mining communities ("Ballad of Hollis Brown" (1963), "North Country Blues" (1963)). By 1963, Dylan and then-singing partner Joan Baez had become prominent in the civil rights movement, singing together at rallies including the March on Washington, where Martin Luther King Jr. delivered his famous "I Have a Dream" speech. However, Dylan, glancing towards the Capitol, is reported to have asked, cynically: "Think they're listening?" Then he is also reported to have answered: "No, they ain't listening at all." Anthony Scaduto contends that many of Dylan's songs of the period were adapted and appropriated by the 1960s Civil Rights and counter-culture "movements" rather than being specifically written for them. Scaduto reports that by 1964 Dylan was attempting to extract himself from the movement, much to the chagrin of many of those who saw him as a voice of a generation. Indeed, some of Dylan's topical songs appear to have been retrospectively aligned with issues which they in fact pre-date. For example, "Masters of War" (1963) which protests against governments who orchestrate war, is sometimes misconstrued as dealing directly with the Vietnam War. However, the song was written at the beginning of 1963, when only a few hundred Green Berets were stationed in South Vietnam and came to be re-appropriated as a comment on Vietnam in 1965, when US planes bombed North Vietnam for the first time, with lines such as "you that build the death planes" seeming particularly prophetic. In contrast to other topical singers of the day, Dylan never mentioned Vietnam by name in any of his songs. Dylan himself has stated rather mysteriously that, although the song "is supposed to be a pacifistic song against war. It's not an anti-war song. It's speaking against what Eisenhower was calling a military-industrial complex as he was making his exit from the presidency. That spirit was in the air, and I picked it up." This understandably must have seemed a distinction without much of a difference to his many anti-war fans. Similarly, "A Hard Rain's A-Gonna Fall" (1963) was perceived by some as about the Cuban Missile Crisis, although Dylan had composed and performed it more than a month before John F. Kennedy's TV address to the nation (October 22, 1962) initiated the Cuban Missile Crisis. Dylan's initial and extremely fruitful 20-month period of overt protest songs ended in 1964, when he changed his musical style from what he termed "finger pointing" acoustic folk to increasingly personal, abstract lyrics. As he explained to Nat Hentoff in mid-1964: "Me, I don't want to write for people anymore – you know, be a spokesman. From now on, I want to write from inside me ... I'm not part of no movement ... I just can't make it with any organisation". In 1965, however, he reproached fans in Northern England, when they booed him for allegedly abandoning the left, saying, "Come on, all my songs are protest songs." Ray Pratt, professor of political science at Montana State University, believes that Dylan stopped writing anthems and other explicit protest songs because he felt that, under the highly repressive conditions prevailing at the time, there was no side with which he wanted to be associated: "'It's vulgar, the idea that somebody has to say what they want to say in a message type song ... 'Which side are you on?' That's such a waste? I mean, which side can you be on.'" His next explicit topical protest song would be "Hurricane", written twelve years later, in 1976.

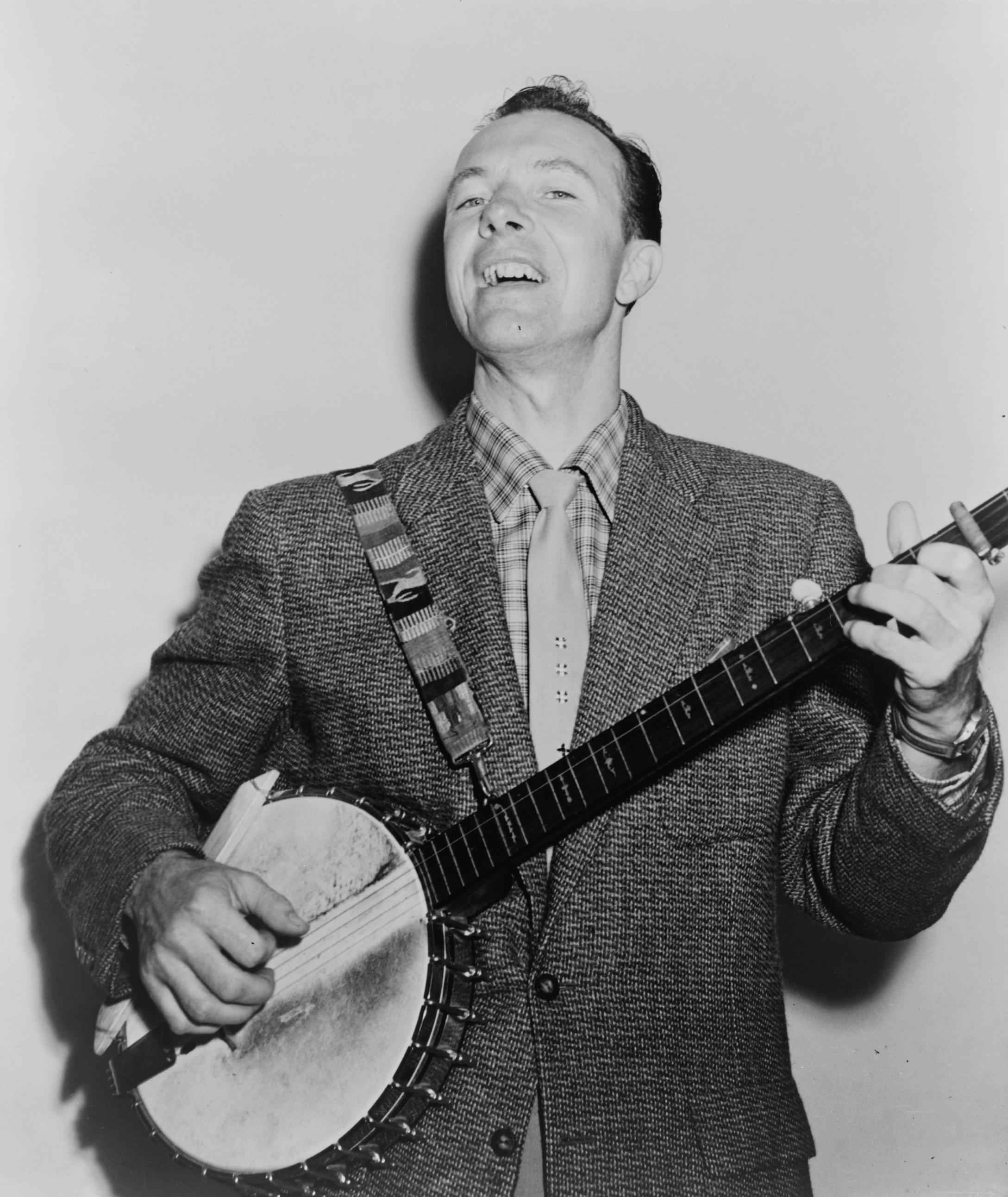
Pete Seeger was a major civil rights advocate (1955).

Pete Seeger, founding member of the Almanac Singers and The Weavers, was a major influence on Dylan and his contemporaries, and continued to be a strong voice of protest in the 1960s, when he composed "Where Have All the Flowers Gone?" (written with Joe Hickerson) and "Turn, Turn, Turn" (written during the 1950s but released on Seeger's 1962 album The Bitter and The Sweet). Seeger's song "If I Had a Hammer", written with Lee Hays in 1949 in support of the progressive movement, rose to Top Ten popularity in 1962 when covered by Peter, Paul and Mary, going on to become one of the major Freedom Songs of the Civil Rights Movement. "We Shall Overcome", Seeger's adaptation of an American gospel song, continues to be used to support issues from labor rights to peace movements. Seeger was one of the leading singers to protest against then-President Lyndon Johnson through song. Seeger first satirically attacked the president with his 1966 recording of Len Chandler's children's song, "Beans in My Ears". In addition to Chandler's original lyrics, Seeger sang that "Mrs. Jay's little son Alby" had "beans in his ears", which, as the lyrics imply, ensures that a person does not hear what is said to them. To those opposed to continuing the Vietnam War, the phrase suggested that "Alby Jay", a loose pronunciation of Johnson's nickname "LBJ", did not listen to anti-war protests as he too had "beans in his ears". Seeger attracted wider attention in 1967 with his song "Waist Deep in the Big Muddy", about a captain – referred to in the lyrics as "the big fool" – who drowned while leading a platoon on maneuvers in Louisiana during World War II. In the face of arguments with the management of CBS about whether the song's political weight was in keeping with the usually light-hearted entertainment of the Smothers Brothers Comedy Hour, the final lines were "Every time I read the paper / those old feelings come on / We are waist deep in the Big Muddy and the big fool says to push on." And it was not seriously contested that much of the audience would grasp Seeger's allegorical casting of Johnson as the "big fool" and the Vietnam War the foreseeable danger. Although the performance was cut from the September 1967 show, after wide publicity, it was broadcast when Seeger appeared again on the Smothers Brothers show the following January.

Phil Ochs, one of the leading protest singers of the decade (or, as he preferred, a "topical singer"), performed at many political events, including anti-Vietnam War and civil rights rallies, student events, and organized labor events over the course of his career, in addition to many concert appearances at such venues as New York City's The Town Hall and Carnegie Hall. Politically, Ochs described himself as a "left social democrat" who turned into an "early revolutionary" after the 1968 Democratic National Convention in Chicago, which had a profound effect on his state of mind. Some of his best known protest songs include "Power and the Glory", "Draft Dodger Rag", "There but for Fortune", "Changes", "Crucifixion", "When I'm Gone", "Love Me, I'm a Liberal", "Links on the Chain", "Ringing of Revolution", and "I Ain't Marching Anymore". Other notable voices of protest from the period included Joan Baez, Buffy Sainte-Marie (whose anti-war song "Universal Soldier" was later made famous by Donovan), and Tom Paxton ("Lyndon Johnson Told the Nation" – about the escalation of the war in Vietnam, "Jimmy Newman" – the story of a dying soldier, and "My Son John" – about a soldier who returns from war unable to describe what he's been through), among others. The first protest song to reach number one in the United States was P.F. Sloan's "Eve Of Destruction", performed by Barry McGuire in 1965.

The civil rights movement of the 1950s and 1960s often used Negro spirituals as a source of protest, changing the religious lyrics to suit the political mood of the time. The use of religious music helped to emphasize the peaceful nature of the protest; it also proved easy to adapt, with many improvised call-and-response songs being created during marches and sit-ins. Some imprisoned protesters used their incarceration as an opportunity to write protest songs. These songs were carried across the country by Freedom Riders, and many of these became Civil Rights anthems. Many soul singers of the period, such as Sam Cooke ("A Change Is Gonna Come" (1965)), Otis Redding and Aretha Franklin ("Respect"), James Brown ("Say It Loud – I'm Black and I'm Proud" (1968); "I Don't Want Nobody to Give Me Nothing (Open Up the Door, I'll Get It Myself)" (1969)), Curtis Mayfield & The Impressions ("We're a Winner") (1967); and Nina Simone ("Mississippi Goddam" (1964), "To Be Young, Gifted and Black" (1970)) wrote and performed many protest songs which addressed the ever-increasing demand for equal rights for African Americans during the civil rights movement. The predominantly white music scene of the time also produced a number of songs protesting racial discrimination, including Janis Ian's "Society's Child (Baby I've Been Thinking)" in 1966, about an interracial romance forbidden by a girl's mother and frowned upon by her peers and teachers and a culture that classifies citizens by race. Steve Reich's 13-minute-long "Come Out" (1966), which consists of manipulated recordings of a single spoken line given by an injured survivor of the Harlem Race Riots of 1964, protested police brutality against African Americans. In late 1968, Sly and the Family Stone released the single "Everyday People", which became the band's first number-one hit. "Everyday People" was a protest against prejudices of all kinds, and popularized the catchphrase "different strokes for different folks." The Family Stone featured Caucasians Greg Errico and Jerry Martini in its lineup, as well as females Rose Stone and Cynthia Robinson; making it the first major integrated band in rock history. Sly & the Family Stone's message was about peace and equality through music, and this song reflects the same.

In the 1960s and early 1970s many protest songs were written and recorded condemning the war in Vietnam, most notably "Simple Song of Freedom" by Bobby Darin (1969), "I Ain't Marching Anymore" by Ochs (1965), "Lyndon Johnson Told The Nation" by Tom Paxton (1965), "Bring Them Home" by Seeger (1966), "Requiem for the Masses" by The Association (1967), "Saigon Bride" by Baez (1967), "Waist Deep in the Big Muddy" by Seeger (1967), "Suppose They Give a War and No One Comes" by The West Coast Pop Art Experimental Band (1967), "The "Fish" Cheer/I-Feel-Like-I'm-Fixin'-to-Die Rag" by Country Joe and the Fish (1968), "The Unknown Soldier" by The Doors (1968), "One Tin Soldier" by Original Caste (1969), "Volunteers" by Jefferson Airplane (1969), "Fortunate Son" by Creedence Clearwater Revival (1969), and the album Back to the World by Curtis Mayfield. Woody Guthrie's son Arlo Guthrie also wrote one of the decade's most famous protest songs in the form of the 18-minute long-talking blues song "Alice's Restaurant Massacree", a bitingly satirical protest against the Vietnam War draft. As an extension of these concerns, artists started to protest the ever-increasing escalation of nuclear weapons and threat of nuclear warfare; as for example on Tom Lehrer's ""So Long, Mom (A Song for World War III)," "Who's Next?" (about nuclear proliferation) and "Wernher von Braun" from his 1965 collection of political satire songs That Was the Year That Was. Folk/Blues singer Barbara Dane's protest albums during the Vietnam War included "Songs of the GI Resistance" with active duty GIs, and "I Hate the Capitalist System." The latter included the track "The Kent State Massacre" written by Jack Warshaw. Warshaw, a draft resistor exiled in the UK, wrote several anti-Vietnam songs during his period with The Critics Group specifically for their "Off Limits" series of radio shows aimed at GIs in Vietnam. In the mid-70s Warshaw wrote "If They Come in the Morning" aka "No Time for Love," recorded and widely popularised by Irish group Moving Hearts from 1980.

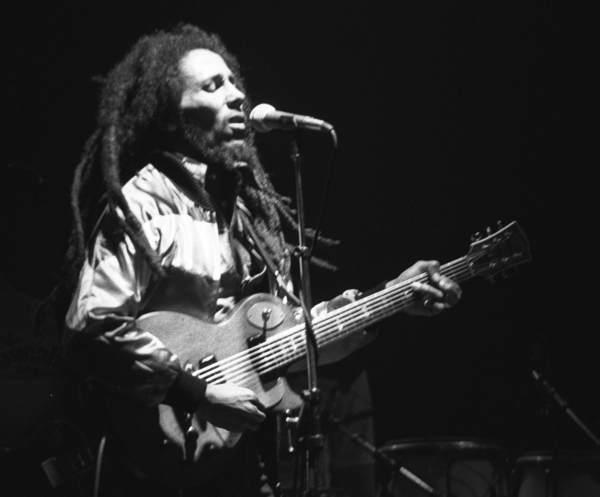
Bob Marley's music impacted people in his native Jamaica, and around the world

In Jamaica, the ravages of poverty and racism were not lost upon the youth movement there. The birth of reggae music addressed issues of all kinds, but it can be argued that Bob Marley had perhaps the most impact on a generation there, with songs addressing his views on nuclear proliferation, and slavery, in his famous "Redemption Song", recorded shortly before his premature death shortly afterward. The song urges listeners to "Emancipate yourself from mental slavery," because "none but ourselves can free our minds."

The 1960s also saw some successful counterprotest songs from the political right, which supported the war. Perhaps the most successful of these was "The Ballad of the Green Berets" (1966) by Barry Sadler, then an active-duty staff sergeant in the United States Army Special Forces, which was one of the very few songs of the era to cast the military in a positive light and yet become a major hit. Merle Haggard & the Strangers's "Okie from Muskogee" (1969), despite being strongly nationalistic, was listed in PopMatters's July 2007 list of the top 65 protest songs because it is, as the webzine puts it,

in fact a protest against changing social mores, alternative lifestyles, and, well, protests ... In a time when protest songs filled the airwaves, it is ironic that Haggard scored his biggest hit protesting the rise of a discontented culture.

The Youngbloods, best known for the song "Get Together", subsequently recorded "Hippie from Olema" in response to, and satirizing, Haggard. To prevent any ambiguity about who its intended target was, the song contained the line, "We still take in strangers if they're haggard". Chinga Chavin wrote the vulgar parody "Asshole from El Paso" in response to Haggard's song as well.

Though originally and still largely Cuban, nueva trova became popular across Latin America, especially in Puerto Rico in the 1960s. The movements biggest stars included Puerto Ricans such as Roy Brown, Andrés Jiménez, Antonio Cabán Vale and the group Haciendo Punto en Otro Son.

==== 1970s: the Vietnam war, soul music ====
"Machine Gun" is a song written by American musician Jimi Hendrix, and originally recorded by Band of Gypsys for their self-titled live album (1970). It is a lengthy, loosely defined (jam-based) protest of the Vietnam War, and perhaps a broader comment on conflict of any kind. The Kent State shootings of May 4, 1970 amplified sentiment that was portrayed by the United States' invasion of Cambodia and the Vietnam War in general, and protest songs about the Vietnam War continued to grow in popularity and frequency. There were anti-war songs such as Chicago's "It Better End Soon" (1970), "War" (1969) by Edwin Starr, "Ohio" (1970) by Crosby, Stills, Nash, and Young, and "Bring The Boys Home" by Freda Payne (1971). Another great influence on the anti-Vietnam war protest songs of the early seventies was the fact that this was the first generation where combat veterans were returning prior to the end of the war, and that even the veterans were protesting the war, as with the formation of the "Vietnam Veterans Against the War" (VVAW). Graham Nash wrote his "Oh! Camil (The Winter Soldier)" (1973) to tell the story of one member of VVAW, Scott Camil. Other notable anti-war songs of the time included Stevie Wonder's frank condemnation of Richard Nixon's Vietnam policies in his 1974 song "You Haven't Done Nothin'". Protest singer and activist Baez dedicated the entire B side of her album Where Are You Now, My Son? (1973) to recordings she had made of bombings while in Hanoi. Steely Dan's "King of the World" on their 1973 album Countdown to Ecstasy joined the protest against nuclear war.

There has been speculation that the Guess Who's anti-war protest song "American Woman" (1970) is addressed to a female U.S. armed-forces recruiter by a draft-dodger.

While the subject of war continued to dominate the protest songs of the early 1970s, there were other issues addressed by bands of the time, such as Helen Reddy's feminist hit "I Am Woman" (1972), which became an anthem for the women's liberation movement. Dylan also made a brief return to protest music after some twelve years with "Hurricane" (1975), which protested the imprisonment of Rubin "Hurricane" Carter as a result of alleged acts of racism and profiling against Carter, which Dylan describes as leading to a false trial and conviction. "(Don't Worry) If There's a Hell Below, We're All Going to Go" is a funk/soul song originally recorded by Curtis Mayfield for his album Curtis (1970). The song was meant to serve as a warning regarding the state of race relations and the tempest growing in America's inner cities.

Soul music carried over into the early part of the 70s, in many ways taking over from folk music as one of the strongest voices of protest in American music, the most important of which being Marvin Gaye's 1971 protest album What's Going On, which included "Inner City Blues", "Mercy Mercy Me (The Ecology)", and the title track. Another hugely influential protest album of the time was poet and musician Gil Scott-Heron's Small Talk at 125th and Lenox, which contained the oft-referenced protest song "The Revolution Will Not Be Televised". The album's 15 tracks dealt with myriad themes, protesting the superficiality of television and mass consumerism, the hypocrisy of some would-be Black revolutionaries, white middle-class ignorance of the difficulties faced by inner-city residents, and fear of homosexuals.

==== 1980s: anti-Reagan protest songs and the birth of rap ====
The Reagan administration was also coming in for its fair share of criticism, with many mainstream protest songs attacking his policies, such as Bruce Springsteen's "Born in the U.S.A." (1984), and "My Brain Is Hanging Upside Down" by The Ramones. This sentiment was countered by songs like "God Bless the U.S.A." by Lee Greenwood, which was seen by many as a protest against protests against the Reagan Administration. Billy Joel's "Allentown" protested the decline of the rust belt, and represented those coping with the demise of the American manufacturing industry. Reagan came under significant criticism for the Iran-Contra Affair, in which it was discovered that his administration was selling arms to the radical Islamic regime in Iran and using proceeds from the sales to illegally fund the Contras, a guerilla/terrorist group in Nicaragua. A number of songs were written in protest of this scandal. "All She Wants to Do Is Dance", (1984) by Don Henley, protested against the U.S. involvement with the Contras in Nicaragua, while chastising Americans for only wanting to dance, while molotov cocktails, and sales of guns and drugs are going on around them, and while "the boys" (the CIA, NSA, etc.) are "makin' a buck or two". Other songs to protest America's role in the Iran-Contra affair include "The Big Stick" by Minutemen, "Nicaragua" by Bruce Cockburn, "Please Forgive Us" by 10,000 Maniacs, and "Managua" by Naked Raygun.

The song I Can't Drive 55, by Sammy Hagar is also protest anthem about the National Maximum Speed Law and is considered to be one of the greatest Hard rock songs of all time. The law was partly repealed in 1986, 2 years after the song's release and fully in 1995.

The 1980s also saw the rise of rap and hip-hop, and with it bands such as Grandmaster Flash ("The Message" [1982]), Boogie Down Productions ("Stop the Violence" [1988]),"N.W.A ("Fuck tha Police" [1988]) and Public Enemy ("Fight the Power" [1989], "911 (Is a Joke)"), who vehemently protested the discrimination and poverty which the black community faced in the U.S., in particular focusing on police discrimination. In 1988 The Stop the Violence Movement was formed by rapper KRS-One in response to violence in the hip hop and black communities. Including some of the biggest stars in contemporary East Coast hip hop (including Public Enemy), the movement released a single, "Self Destruction", in 1989, with all proceeds going to the National Urban League.

Punk music continued to be a strong voice of protest in the 1980s, especially as relating to the Cold War, nuclear fear, and conservative politics. As the decade progressed, punk developed a heavier and more aggressive sound, as typified by Black Flag (whose debut album, Damaged (1981), was described by the BBC as "essentially an album of electric protest songs [... that] takes a swing at the insularities and shortcomings of the 'me' generation."), Dead Kennedys (whose sweeping criticism of the U.S., "Stars and Stripes of Corruption" (1985), contains the lyric "Rednecks and bombs don't make us strong / We loot the world, yet we can't even feed ourselves"), and Bad Religion; a tradition carried on in the following decades more modern punk band like Anti-Flag and Rise Against. Of the few remaining old-school punks still recording in the late 80s, the most notable protest song is Patti Smith's 1988 recording "People Have the Power".

The radical environmental movement Earth First! featured numerous folk and country musicians amongst its ranks from the 1980s onwards. These included Dana Lyons, Judi Bari, Daryl Cherney, Joanne Rand, Bill Oliver, Cecelia Ostrow, and Bart Koehler. Dozens of musicians performed at public meetings, protests, blockades and gatherings, with many parodies and original songs written about and for the movement. These included "Amazing Waste", "They'll Be Tearing Down The Mountain", "Shopping Maul", "The FBI Stole My Fiddle" and "Turn of the Wrench".

==== 1990s: hard-rock protest bands, women's rights, and protest parodies ====
In 1990, singer Melba Moore released a modern rendition of the song "Lift Every Voice and Sing" – which had long been considered "The Negro National Anthem" and one of the 20th century's most powerful civil rights anthems – which she recorded along with others, including R&B artists Anita Baker, Stephanie Mills, Dionne Warwick, Bobby Brown, Stevie Wonder, Jeffrey Osborne, and Howard Hewett; and gospel artists BeBe and CeCe Winans, Take 6, and The Clark Sisters. Partly because of the success of this recording, "Lift Ev'ry Voice and Sing" was entered into the Congressional Record as the official African American National Hymn.

Rage Against the Machine, formed in 1991, has been one of the most popular 'social-commentary' bands of the last 20 years. A fusion of the musical styles and lyrical themes of punk, hip-hop, and thrash, Rage Against the Machine railed against corporate America ("No Shelter", "Bullet in the Head"), government oppression ("Killing in the Name"), and Imperialism ("Sleep Now in the Fire", "Bulls on Parade"). The band used its music as a vehicle for social activism, as lead singer Zack de la Rocha espoused: "Music has the power to cross borders, to break military sieges and to establish real dialogue".

The 1990s also saw a sizable movement of pro-women's rights protest songs from many musical genres as part of the Third-wave feminism movement. Ani DiFranco was at the forefront of this movement, protesting sexism, sexual abuse, homophobia, reproductive rights as well as racism, poverty, and war. Her "Lost Woman Song" (1990) concerns itself with the hot topic of abortion, and with DiFranco's assertion that a woman has a right to choose without being judged. A particularly prevalent movement of the time was the underground feminist punk Riot Grrrl movement, including a number of outspoken protest bands such as Bikini Kill, Bratmobile, Jack Off Jill, Excuse 17, Heavens to Betsy, Huggy Bear, Sleater-Kinney, and also lesbian queercore bands such as Team Dresch. Sonic Youth's "Swimsuit Issue" (1992) protested the way in which women are objectified and turned into a commodity by the media. The song, in which Kim Gordon lists off the names of every model featured in the 1992 Sports Illustrated Swimsuit Issue, was selected as one of PopMatters's 65 greatest protest songs of all time with the praise that "Sonic Youth reminds us that protest songs don't have to include acoustic guitars and twee harmonica melodies stuck in 1965. They don't even have to be about war."

But, for the most part, the 1990s signaled a decline in the popularity of protest songs in the mainstream media and public consciousness – even resulting in some parodies of the genre. The 1992 film Bob Roberts is an example of protest music parody, in which the title character, played by American actor Tim Robbins, who also wrote and directed the film, is a guitar-playing U.S. Senatorial candidate who writes and performs songs with a heavily reactionary tone.

=== Twenty-first century ===
==== The Iraq War and the revival of the protest song ====
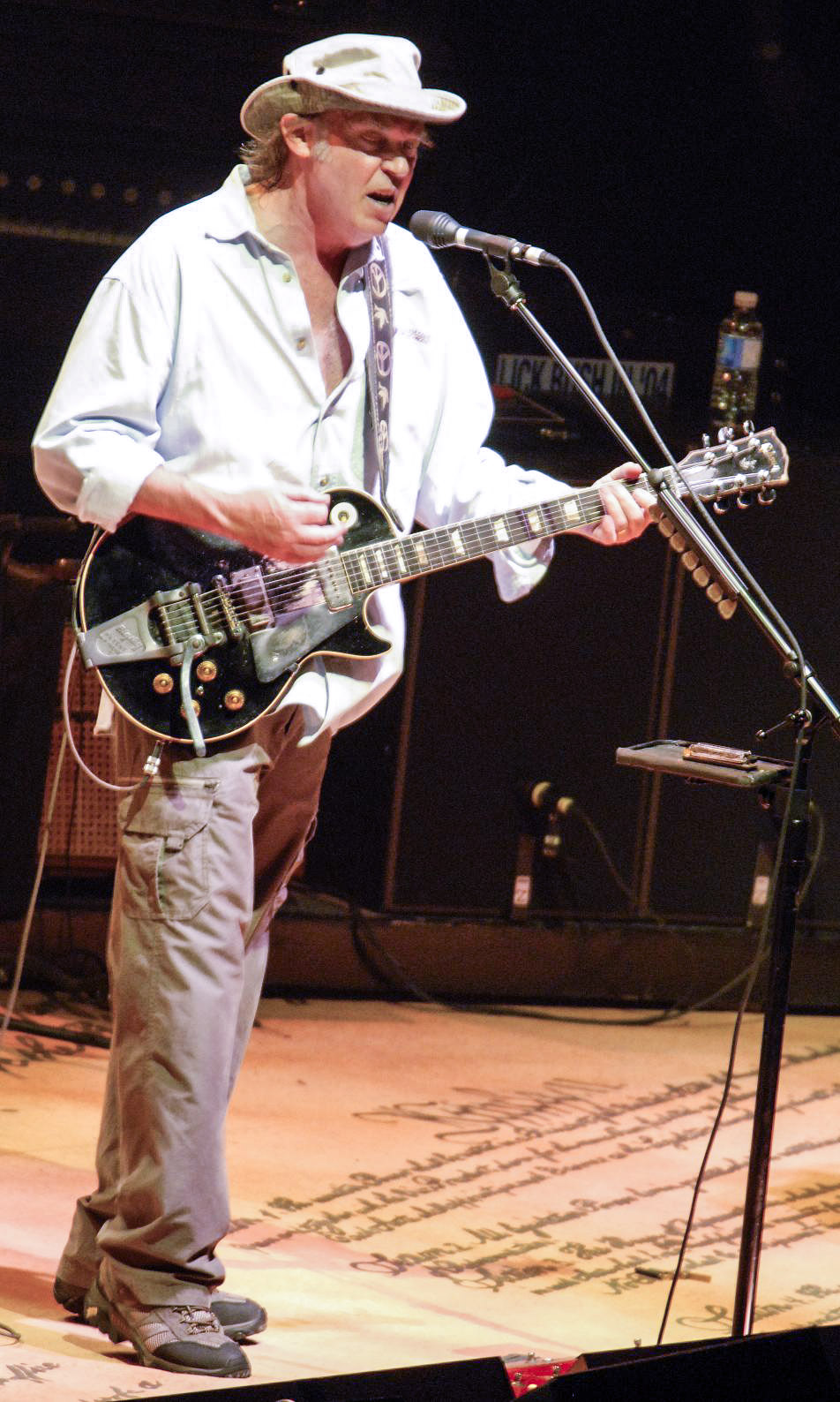
Neil Young, pictured here on the CSN&Y "Freedom of Speech Tour '06," returned to the front of the protest music scene with his album Living with War.

After the 1990s, the protest song found renewed popularity around the world after the turn of both the century and the "Third Millennium" as a result of the 9/11 attacks in America, and the Afghanistan and Iraq wars in the Middle East, with America's former president George W. Bush facing the majority of the criticism. Many famous protest singers of yesteryear, such as Neil Young, Patti Smith, Tom Waits, Jake Holmes and Bruce Springsteen, returned to the public eye with new protest songs for the new war. Young approached the theme with his song "Let's Impeach the President" – a rebuke against President George W. Bush and the War in Iraq – as well as Living With War, an album of anti-Bush and anti-war protest songs. Smith wrote two new songs indicting American and Israeli foreign policy – "Qana", about the Israeli airstrike on the Lebanese village of Qana, and "Without Chains", about the U.S. detention center at Guantanamo Bay.

R.E.M., who had been known for their politically charged material in the 1980s, also returned to increasingly political subject matter since the advent of the Iraq War. For example, "Final Straw" (2003) is a politically charged song, reminiscent in tone of "World Leader Pretend" on Green. The version on their Around the Sun album is a remix of the original, which was made available as a free download from the band's website. The song was written as a protest against the U.S. government's actions in the Iraq War.

Waits has also covered increasingly political subject matter since the advent of the Iraq war. In "The Day After Tomorrow", Waits adopts the persona of a soldier writing home that he is disillusioned with war and thankful to be leaving. The song does not mention the Iraq war specifically, and, as Tom Moon writes, "it could be the voice of a Civil War soldier singing a lonesome late-night dirge." Waits himself does describe the song as something of an "elliptical" protest song about the Iraqi invasion, however. Thom Jurek describes "The Day After Tomorrow" as "one of the most insightful and understated anti-war songs to have been written in decades. It contains not a hint of banality or sentiment in its folksy articulation." Waits' recent output has not only addressed the Iraqi war, as his "Road To Peace" deals explicitly with the Israeli-Palestinian conflict and the Middle East in general.

Springsteen was also vocal in his condemnation of the Bush government, among other issues of social commentary. In 2000 he released "American Skin (41 Shots)" about tensions between immigrants in America and the police force, and of the police shooting of Amadou Diallo in particular. For singing about this event, albeit without mentioning Diallo's name, Springsteen was denounced by the Patrolmen's Benevolent Association in New York who called for the song to be blacklisted and by Mayor Rudolph Giuliani amongst others. In the aftermath of 9/11 Springsteen released The Rising, which exhibited his reflections on the tragedy and America's reaction to it. In 2006 he released We Shall Overcome: The Seeger Sessions, a collection of 13 covers of protest songs made popular by Seeger, which highlighted how these older protest songs remained relevant to the troubles of the modern America. An extended version of the album included the track "How Can a Poor Man Stand Such Times and Live?" in which Springsteen rewrote the lyrics of the original to directly address the issue of Hurricane Katrina. His 2007 long-player, Magic, continues Springsteen's tradition of protest song-writing, with a number of songs which continue to question and attack America's role in the Iraqi war. "Last to Die", with its chorus of "Who'll be the last to die for a mistake ... Whose blood will spill, whose heart will break", is believed to have been inspired by Senator-to-be John Kerry's 1971 testimony to the US Senate, in which he asked "How do you ask a man to be the last man to die in Vietnam? How do you ask a man to be the last man to die for a mistake?" "Gypsy Biker" deals with the homecoming of a US Soldier killed in action in Iraq, and Springsteen has said that "Livin' in the Future" references extraordinary rendition and illegal wiretapping. "Long Walk Home" is an account of the narrator's sense that those people living at home "he thought he knew, whose ideals he had something in common with, are like strangers." The recurring lyric "it's gonna be a long walk home" is a response to the violation of "certain things", such as "what we'll do and what we won't", in spite of these codes having been (in the words of the narrator's father) "set in stone" by the characters' "flag flyin' over the courthouse."

==== Protest against GMO ====
Neil Young may be the first artist in the 21st century to record and issue a single protesting against genetically modified food. His single was titled "A Rock Star Bucks a Coffee Shop" which is from his concept album The Monsanto Years. The song itself is about Starbucks and its alleged support of GMO use. The group that backs up Young on the track is Promise of the Real, which includes two of Willie Nelson's sons, Lukas and Micah Nelson. By the end of May 2015, the song which has attracted a lot of media attention was video of the week on the Food Consumer website.

==== Bush administration ====
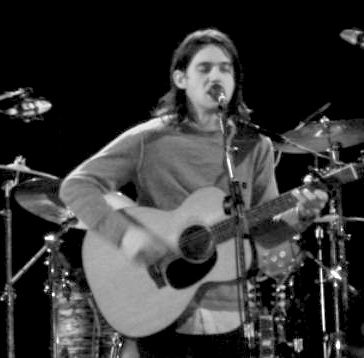
Conor Oberst, lead singer-songwriter of the band Bright Eyes, writer of the anti-Bush protest song "When the President Talks to God".

Modern-day mainstream artists to have written protest songs on this subject include Pink, with her appeal to Bush in "Dear Mr. President" (2006), Kevin Devine with "No Time Flat" (2005), and Bright Eyes with "When the President Talks to God" (2005) (which was hailed by the Portland, Oregon, alternative paper Willamette Week as "this young century's most powerful protest song."), Dispatch's anti-war underground hit "The General", and Devendra Banhart's "Heard somebody Say" (2005), in which he sings "it's simple, we don't want to kill." In 2003 Lenny Kravitz recorded the protest song "We Want Peace" with Iraqi pop star Kadim Al Sahir, Arab-Israeli strings musician Simon Shaheen and Lebanese percussionist Jamey Hadded. According to Kravitz, the song "is about more than Iraq. It is about our role as people in the world and that we all should cherish freedom and peace." The Decemberists, while not normally known for writing political songs (or songs set in the present day, for that matter), contributed to the genre in 2005 with their understated but scathing song "16 Military Wives", which singer Colin Meloy described thus: "It's kind of a protest song, ... My objective is to make sense of foreign policy decisions taken by the current Bush administration and showing how they resemble solipsistic bullying." Pearl Jam also included two anti-Bush songs ("World Wide Suicide", "Marker in the Sand") in their 2006 album Pearl Jam. Even the banking system can be the focus of a protest song, as in "National Strike!" by Loren Dean, on showcaseyourmusic.com. Prince recorded the song "United States of Division", a 2004 B-side to the track Cinnamon Girl in which he sings "Why should I sing 'God Bless America' / but not the rest of the world?" Singer-songwriter David Dondero released a song on his 2003 album Live at the Hemlock called "Pre-Invasion Jitters", in which he calls George W. Bush an "illegitimate president" and criticizes "gung-ho war guys" for taking his word as "heaven sent."

In 2002, rock group Sleater-Kinney released the song "Combat Rock" from their album One Beat. In it, the group satirizes Bush's call to support the economy and live life as normal (a statement seen as a push to shop.) This is evident in lyrics such as "..Go out and spend some cash / Red white blue hot pants, doing it for Uncle Sam." In addition, the song opposed many ideals of the Bush administration, particularly criticizing his belief that those who were anti-war were terrorists.

The hip-hop group Beastie Boys had a number of protest songs on their 2004 release To the 5 Boroughs. Songs such as "It Takes Time To Build" and "Right Right Now Now" take particular aim at the Bush administration and its policies.

While Green Day has made protest songs before and after, their critically acclaimed 2004 album American Idiot contains several politically charged protest songs. The title track and lead single, "American Idiot", was aimed at George W. Bush, while the single "Holiday" lambasts the 2003 invasion of Iraq. Similarly, the music video for "Wake Me Up When September Ends" portrays a young man going off to fight in the war, showing the real consequences typified by the war.

"Welcome to the War (It's Over)"
by Seriously, Argon Duck

American avant-garde singer Bobby Conn wrote an album of anti-Bush songs with his 2004 collection The Homeland. Conn has stated that "[a]ll the records that I've done are a critique of what's going on in contemporary America". Conn has admitted that while he actively protests what he sees as the evils of American society, he is not always at ease with such a label for himself. "I've always done lots of social commentary that I believe in pretty strongly but I am very uncomfortable with the role of the artist as a meaningful social critic ... my whole generation [is] a confused group of people with an ambivalent way of dealing with protest." Discussing his 2007 album King for a Day, Conn stated "it's political, but just in a contemporary culture kind of way ... Two of the songs are about Tom Cruise, and I don't know if there's a more political statement than Tom Cruise. He kind of symbolizes a lot of what's going on in this country right now and how people are responding to it."

Bobb Conn on being a "protest singer":

It's great when Curtis Mayfield does it, but when Mick Jagger writes about being a street-fighting man, it just kind of makes you sick. Or the Beatles singing about revolution. They're entertainers – it's a pose, it's bullshit. I'm more of a vaudevillian than I am a political commentator. I don't think people should turn to music for their serious information. People should read the newspaper.

Arcade Fire's 2007 Neon Bible contains many oblique protests against the paranoia of a contemporary America "under attack by terrorism". The album also contains two more overtly political protest songs in the form of "Windowsill", in which Win Butler sings "I don't want to live in America no more", and "Intervention", which contains the line "Don't want to fight, don't want to die", and criticizes religious fanaticism in general. However, the protest album to achieve the most mainstream success in the first decade of the 21st century was Green Day's American Idiot, which was awarded a Grammy for "Best Rock Album" in 2005, despite its strong criticism of current American foreign policy and George Bush. The title track from the album was described by the band as their public statement in reaction to the confusing and warped scene that is American pop culture since 9/11.

In particular, rapper Eminem has encountered controversy over protest songs directed towards George W. Bush. Songs such as "Mosh", "White America", and "We As Americans" have either targeted Bush or the U.S. government in general. Eminem registered to vote for the first time in 2004, just for the sake of voting Bush out of office.

Outside of pop music, folk, punk and country music continue to follow their strong traditions of protest. Utah Philips, and David Rovics, among many other singers, have continued the folk tradition of protest. In John Mayer's 2006 release CONTINUUM, the lead single "Waiting on the World to Change", Mayer is critical of the desensitizing of politics in youths. He goes on to say in "Belief", "What puts a hundred thousand children in the sand? Belief can. What puts the folded flag inside his mother's hand? Belief can." Folk singer Dar Williams's song "Empire" from her 2005 album My Better Self accuses the Bush administration of building a new empire based on the fear of terror, as well as protesting the administration's policy on torture: "We'll kill the terrorizers and a million of their races, but when our people torture you that's a few random cases." Lucy Kaplansky, who has also performed protest songs with Dar Williams in their side project Cry Cry Cry, has written many songs of protest since 9/11, including her tribute to that day – "Land of the Living" – however, her most recognised protest song to date is "Line in the Sand", which includes the line: "Another bomb lights up the night of someone's vision of paradise but it's just a wasted sacrifice that fuels the hate on the other side." Tracy Grammer's song "Hey ho", from her 2005 album Flower of Avalon addresses how children are taught from a young age to play at war as soldiers with plastic guns, perpetuating the war machine: "Wave the flag and watch the news, tell us we can count on you. Mom and dad are marching too; children, step in line."

Punk rock still is a formidable force and constitutes a majority of the protest songs written today. Artists such as Anti-Flag, Bad Religion, NOFX, Rise Against, Authority Zero, to name just a few, are noted for their political activism in denouncing the Bush administration and the policies of the American government in general. The political campaign Punkvoter, which started the project Rock Against Bush, was kicked off with a collection of punk rock songs critical of President Bush called "Rock Against Bush, Vol. 1", and a sequel was released in 2004. Representatives from the punk community such as Fat Mike of NOFX, Henry Rollins (formerly of Black Flag), and Jello Biafra of the Dead Kennedys are noted for their continuing political activism. In 2009, Conor Oberst and the Mystic Valley Band released Roosevelt Room, which among many things protests the perils of America's wealth gap specifically involving the United States' working class.

While country music has offered the loudest voice in support of the war through artists such as Toby Keith's "Courtesy of the Red, White, & Blue (The Angry American)", Darryl Worley's "Have You Forgotten?" and Charlie Daniels, many established country artists have released strongly critical anti-war songs. These include Willie Nelson, Merle Haggard, Emmylou Harris, the Dixie Chicks ("Not Ready to Make Nice" (2006)) and Nanci Griffith.

==== Black Lives Matter and police brutality ====
After the death of Michael Brown, Black Lives Matter has become a widely known social movement. Artist have begun creating songs in support of Black Lives Matter and anti-police brutality. A primary protest slogan of Black Lives Matter is "I can't breathe" following the death of Eric Garner. These were Garner's last words before he died. Garner's siblings, Ellisha and Steven, took his last words and made the song "I Can't Breathe". Garners family told Billboard the song is dedicated to "the struggle everyone is going through." During the song, Steven raps "A system that took my brother from me / No matter how much money I receive, I can hear my brother crying 'I can't breathe."

Beyoncé has become a face of Black Lives Matter with her song, "Formation". In the music video for "Formation", there are images of Beyoncé laying on top of a sinking New Orleans police car and walls with "Stop Killing Us" painted on it. While she received criticism for her appropriation of Hurricane Katrina, her song still was representative of the movement. A leader of Black Lives Matter, Alicia Garza, welcomed Beyoncé to the movement when the song was released. In an article Garza wrote for Rolling Stone, she applauds Beyoncé and says she "joins only a handful of celebrities courageous enough not just to reference a growing movement happening around her, but to proudly place herself within it." Garza sees the song as support of the movement as she states "Bey told us who her people are, how that makes her who she is," and that the "best revenge is being successful; that she likes her men black, with the nostrils to match." Beyoncé continued her support when she performed the song at Super Bowl 50's half-time show which peaked at 115.5 million viewers during half-time. When asked about critiques saying the song is anti-police, Beyoncé says "let's be clear: I am against police brutality and injustice. Those are two separate things. If celebrating my roots and culture during Black History Month made anyone uncomfortable, those feelings were there long before a video and long before me."

Beyoncé continued her support of Black Lives Matter with her song "Freedom". The music video contains the mothers of notable African American police victims, Eric Garner, Michael Brown, and Trayvon Martin. In the video, the mothers are holding the pictures of their children. Beyoncé also had the mothers accompany her to the Video Music Awards in 2016.

After the death of Michael Brown, J. Cole went to Ferguson, Missouri, to speak with the protestors who were outraged by his death. In response to the shooting, Cole released "Be, Free". Cole wrote that "We become distracted. We become numb. I became numb. But not anymore. That coulda been me, easily. It could have been my best friend ... I made a song. This is how we feel." The lyrics of the song include "I'm letting' you know / That there ain't no gun they make that can kill my soul / Oh, no." Cole performed "Be, Free" on the Late Show with David Letterman in 2014.

On November 28, 2014, Richard Rossi was in the news regarding the controversy over the shooting of Michael Brown. Rossi wrote and recorded a protest song expressing his feelings about a grand jury's decision not to charge a white police officer in the death of the unarmed black teen in Ferguson, Missouri. "I wrote the song in five minutes as a way to express my emotions about the danger of trigger-happy police," Rossi said. "I filmed it on my laptop at my kitchen table and uploaded it to YouTube." Rossi uploaded the video on November 26, and provided the song's lyrics in the video description. Here is a sample from the song's beginning, printed in the Los Angeles Daily News: "Down at the courthouse on a Monday afternoon/Justice was thrown right out the window when a young white cop entered the room."

Kendrick Lamar's song "Alright" has also become an anthem for Black Lives Matter. The lyrics include "Wanna kill us dead in the street fo sho'" and "My knees getting' weak and my gun might blow / But we gon' be alright." "We gon' be alright" has become a protest chant during the movements of Black Lives Matter. Lamar discusses his song's relation with the movement during a New York Times interview in 2015. When asked if he knew it was becoming an anthem for Black Lives Matter he says, "When I'd go in certain parts of the world, and they were singing it in the streets. When it's outside of the concerts, then you know it's a little bit more deep-rooted than just a song. It's more than just a piece of a record. It's something that people live by – your words." He also says that it is a "chant of hope and feeling." At a rally in Ohio, "Alright" became an anthem for the protestors. A 14-year-old boy got in a confrontation with police over an opened alcohol container. Protestors noticed the altercation and surrounded the police and boy. Once the boy was released into his mother's custody, the crowd began chanting the refrain, "We gon' be alright!"

Janelle Monáe and Wondaland Records also recorded their own song in protest of the extrajudicial killings of African American men and women titled "Hell You Talmbout".

In 2015, during demonstrations at Harvard University in support of Black Lives Matter, Joshuah Campbell wrote and performed Sing Out March On, which he was invited to perform again during Harvard's 2018 commencement ceremony in honor of commencement speaker John Lewis.

In 2018, Childish Gambino released "This Is America" along with an accompanying video that served as a commentary on the black experience and police brutality in the United States.

In 2019, Raphael Saadiq released his album Jimmy Lee, an examination of traumas in the African-American community featuring the protest song "Rikers Island".

In June 2020, Rafa Pabón released the protest song and music video, "Sin Aire (Without Air)," in response to the murder of George Floyd and the killing of Eric Garner, police brutality, and racial inequality in the United States.

On June 4, 2020, YG released a single titled "FTP", a nod to the N.W.A's song "Fuck tha Police".

On June 12, 2020, Lil Baby released "The Bigger Picture" following George Floyd's murder. The song peaked at number 3 on the Billboard Hot 100 and was the highest-charting song of his career at the time.

Despite its apolitical nature, "Dior" by Pop Smoke became an unlikely protest anthem during the George Floyd Protests as a rallying cry of defiance against police brutality. In 2021, Rolling Stone called the song "the unofficial anthem of uprisings across the country".

Protest songs continue to be written and produced in response to various current events issues surrounding police brutality and Black Lives Matter.

==== Trump administration ====
After the US presidential election of 2016, in protest of Donald Trump, Fiona Apple wrote "Tiny Hands", Melanie Martinez released "The Principal" in film and album K-12 (film), YG recorded FDT, and The Bright Light Social Hour released Tear Down That Wall on Trump's Inauguration Day. In 2020, Demi Lovato wrote "Commander In Chief" to address Trump's mishandling of the COVID-19 pandemic and Black Lives Matter. Protest songs aimed at the former president continued to be released after Trump's first term and prior to his nomination for a second term, such as "C'mon Armageddon" by Fantastic Cat in 2022. Bruce Springsteen would release "Streets of Minneapolis" in January 2026 in response to anti-I.C.E. protests and the deaths of Renée Good and Alex Pretti.

==== Puerto Rican government ====
In response to Telegramgate, Puerto Rican musicians Bad Bunny, Residente, and iLE released the protest song "Afilando los cuchillos" on July 17, 2019. It is a Diss Track calling for the resignation of Ricardo Rosselló.

== Criticism ==
Some artists who are not traditionally right-leaning have questioned the validity of the recent spate of anti-war protest songs.

In 2007, anti-globalization writer Naomi Klein attacked the replacement of grass-roots protest by celebrity-endorsed festivals or events, such as the Make Poverty History campaign; a trend which she calls the "Bono-isation" of protests against world poverty. She is quoted in The Times newspaper as attesting that "The Bono-isation of protest, particularly in the UK, has reduced discussion to a much safer terrain ... there's celebrities and then there's spectators waving their bracelets. It's less dangerous and less powerful [than grass roots street demonstrations]."

== See also ==
- Music of the United States
- American folk music revival

== Further reading and listening ==
- Gilliland, John (1969). "Revolt of the Fat Angel: American musicians respond to the British invaders" (audio). Pop Chronicles. University of North Texas Libraries.
- Greenway, John (1953). American Folksongs of Protest. Philadelphia: University of Pennsylvania Press. Reprint: New York: A.S. Barnes, 1960.
- Lomax, Alan; compiler and editor. Hard Hitting Songs for Hard-Hit People. Woody Guthrie, Introduction and Song Notes. Pete Seeger, Music Editor, Transcriptions, and Afterword. John Steinbeck, Foreword. Irwin Silber, New Foreword. University of Nebraska Press, 1999.
- Sullivan, Denise. Keep on Pushing: Black Power Music from Blues to Hip-Hop. Chicago: Lawrence Hill Books, 2011.
