= Adolphus Hailstork =

American composer and educator (born 1941)

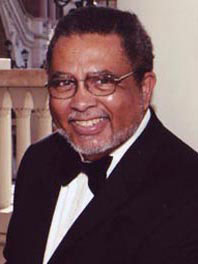
- Adolphus Hailstork
- Born: Adolphus Cunningham Hailstork III; April 17, 1941 (age 85); Rochester, New York, US
- Education: Manhattan School of Music (BM, MM); Michigan State University (PhD)
- Occupations: Composer; educator

Adolphus Cunningham Hailstork III (born April 17, 1941) is an American composer and educator. He was born in Rochester, New York, and grew up in Albany, New York, where he studied violin, piano, organ, and voice. He currently resides in Virginia Beach, Virginia.

== Career ==
Hailstork began his musical career in 1963, when he studied composition with Mark Fax at Howard University, Washington, D.C. (BMus 1963). In the summer of 1963 he attended the American Conservatory at Fontainebleau, France, where he studied with Nadia Boulanger. In 1965, Hailstork received a Bachelor of Music from the Manhattan School of Music, where he studied under Vittorio Giannini and David Diamond, and in 1966 received a Master of Music at the same institution. After studying under H. Owen Reed, Hailstork received his PhD in composition from Michigan State University in 1971.

From 1969 to 1971, Hailstork taught at Michigan State University. He then served as professor at Youngstown State University in Ohio from 1971 to 1976, and in 1977 accepted a post as professor of music and Composer-in-Residence at Virginia's Norfolk State University. He also taught as professor of music and Composer-in-Residence at Old Dominion University in Norfolk, Virginia.

Hailstork's works blend musical ideas from the African, American and European traditions as these form a part of his heritage.

In October 2022, he was featured as "Composer of the Week" on BBC Radio 3.

Hailstork married in 2007.

== Awards and publications ==
- 1971: Ernest Bloch Award for choral composition
  - Mourn Not the Dead
- 1977: Belwin-Mills Max Winkler Award, presented by the Band Directors National Association
  - Out of Depths
- 1983: First Prize, Virginia College Band Directors
  - American Guernica
- 1987: Fulbright fellowship for study in Guyana
- 1992: named a Cultural Laureate of the Commonwealth of Virginia
- 1995: First Prize, University of Delaware Festival of Contemporary Music
  - Consort Piece
- 1999: Brock Commission from the American Choral Directors Association
- 2001: Doctor of Humane Letters honorary doctorate from the College of William & Mary

Hailstork is published by Theodore Presser Company and Carl Fischer Music. Old Dominion University holds several archival documents of Adolphus Hailstork in the special collections area of the F. Ludwig Diehn Composers Room, in the Diehn Fine and Performing Arts Center.

== Selected works ==
Works for Solo Instruments

- 2 Scherzos for solo piano
- Bassoon Set for solo bassoon
- Eight Variations On "Shalom Chaverim" for solo piano
- Five Friends for solo piano
- Flute Set for solo flute
- Four Preludes for solo harp
- Great Day (That Great Gittin' Up Mornin') for solo carillon
- Ignis Fatuus (Mysterious Fires) for solo piano
- Piano Sonata No. 2 for solo piano
- Piano Sonata No. 3 for solo piano
- The Surprising Thing Is for solo violin
- Theme and Variations on "Draw the Sacred Circle Closer" for solo Cello
- Sonata for Solo Cello
- Three Smiles for Tracy for solo clarinet
- Trio Sonata for solo piano
- Two Studies on Chant Melodies for solo organ
- Variations for solo trumpet

Toccata on Veni Emmanuel for Organ/E.C.Schirmer 1996

Works for Chamber Ensemble

- American Fanfare for 3Tpt. 4Hn. 3Tbn. Tu. 3Perc. Timp.
- American Landscape for string duet
- Armegeddon for organ and two percussion
- As Falling Leaves
- Baroque Suite for violin and piano
- The Blue Bag for clarinet and piano
- Consort Piece for septet
- Divertimento for violin and viola
- Evensong for violin and cello
- Fanfare on Amazing Grace for brass quintet, timpani, and organ
- "Fantasy, Elegy & Caprice" for cello and piano
- Fantasy Piece for viola and piano
- Four Hymns Without Words for trumpet and piano
- Guest Suite for four hands on one piano
- Ghosts in Grey and Blue for trumpet, horn, and trombone
- I Am Only One for SATB choir
- John Henry's Big (Man vs. Machine) for trombone and piano
- Little Diversions for Lord Byron's Court for two violins or string duet
- Sanctum for clarinet and piano or viola and piano
- A Simple Caprice for clarinet and piano
- Sonata for trumpet and piano
- Sonata for two pianos
- Springtime for Elephants for two tubas
- String Quartet No. 1
- String Quartet No. 2 - Variations on "Swing Low, Sweet Chariot"
- Three Meditations for viola and organ
- Two by Two for horn and trombone
- Variations on a Guyanese Folk Song for violin and piano
- Ventriloquist Acts of God for soprano and piano
- Violin Concerto for violin and piano
- Who is Sylvia? For Coloratura Soprano, Violin, and Piano

Works for Chorus and Orchestra

- Break Forth for Chorus and Orchestra
- Crispus Attucks - American Patriot for mezzo, tenor, bass-bariton, large chorus, and orchestra
- Done Made My Vow for narrator, soloists, mixed chorus, and orchestra
- EarthRise (A Song of Healing) for two choirs and orchestra
- Four Spirituals for two sopranos, mixed chorus and orchestra
- The Gift of the Magi A “Choral Ballet” for dancers, chamber orchestra and children's chorus
- I Will Lift Up Mine Eyes, cantata for tenor, choir, and orchestra
- Serenade “To Hearts Which Near Each Other Move” for SATB choir and orchestra
- Songs of Innocence for three soloists, chorus and orchestra
- Within Our Gates for solo soprano, solo tenor, SATB chorus and string orchestra
- The World Called for solo soprano, SATB chorus and orchestra

Works for Chorus

- Shout for Joy (The Bank Street Festival Anthem)

Works for Wind Ensemble

- American Guernica

Works for Orchestra

- An American Port of Call
- Baroque Suite for String Orchestra (with optional Harpsichord)
- Church Street Serenade for String Orchestra
- Concertino for Trumpet and Orchestra
- Epitaph for a Man Who Dreamed In memoriam: Martin Luther King, Jr. (1929-1968)
- Essay for Strings
- Fanfare on Amazing Grace for Orchestra
- Hercules
- Intrada
- Lachrymosa: 1919
- Sonata for Trumpet (or Clarinet) and String Orchestra
- Symphony No. 1
- Symphony No. 2
- Symphony No. 3
- Celebration!
- Three Spirituals
- Two Romances for Viola and Chamber Orchestra
- Violin Concerto

Operas

- Joshua’s Boots an Opera in one Act
- Paul Laurence Dunbar: Common Ground An Operatic Theaterpiece
- Rise for Freedom: The John P. Parker Story
