= Pete Seeger: The Power of Song =

2007 documentary film directed by Jim Brown

- Theatrical release poster
- Directed by: Jim Brown
- Starring: Pete Seeger
- Distributed by: The Weinstein Company
- Release date: October 26, 2007
- Country: United States
- Language: English

Pete Seeger: The Power of Song is a 2007 American documentary film directed by Jim Brown about the life and music of the folk singer Pete Seeger. It was produced by The Weinstein Company and Concert Productions International. The film was executive produced by Seeger's wife, filmmaker Toshi Seeger.

== Cast ==
In addition to Seeger family members, interviewees include:

- Pete Seeger
- Arlo Guthrie
- Bruce Springsteen
- Bob Dylan
- Joan Baez
- Tom Paxton
- Mary Travers
- Natalie Maines

== Reception ==
The Hollywood Reporter wrote: "Featuring a wealth of archival material, vintage performance clips and interviews with the ever-dignified subject himself, the documentary provides a fairly comprehensive portrait of Seeger's decades-long musical career and social activism. If at times the proceedings become a bit sentimental, it's well befitting a pop star who lives in a house that he built with his own hands and who still spends his spare time singing to schoolchildren and participating in anti-war and environmental causes."

Variety wrote: "Brown beautifully works Seeger's family life into the story ... illustrating how he incorporated rigid principles of simplicity and environmental conservation into daily life. ... No novice to docus (his last pic was The Weavers: Wasn't That a Time!), Brown fills the screen with handsome, full-frame talking heads that make every commentary come alive. Archival footage and photos are seamlessly woven in, but best of all is the music remastering, each song and concert performance gorgeously reproduced."

The Village Voice wrote: "This laudatory but not quite fawning 93-minute documentary takes a greatest-hits approach to the life and song of the now 88-year-old agit-folk musician. ... Shallow, very officially sanctioned, and overly compressed, The Power of Song plays like a PBS infomercial for the inevitable DVD box set, which will surely include even more archival footage. Director Jim Brown is perhaps too determined to prove the obvious: that Seeger has lived a long, full, admirable life."

On review aggregator website Rotten Tomatoes, the film holds an approval rating of 95% based on 20 reviews, with an average rating of 8.6/10.

== Accolades ==
The film won a 2008 Emmy Award for Outstanding Nonfiction Series.

== Home media ==
The film was released on DVD in 2008 by Genius Products.
