= The Weavers at Carnegie Hall =

Live album by The Weavers
- Released: April 1957
- Recorded: December 24, 1955
- Genre: folk
- Length: 44:44
- Label: Vanguard

The Weavers chronology
We Wish You a Merry Christmas (1952)	The Weavers at Carnegie Hall (1957)	Folk Songs Around the World (1959)

Professional ratings
Review scores
Source	Rating
Allmusic	5/5 stars

The Weavers at Carnegie Hall (1957) is the second album by the Weavers. The concert was recorded live at Carnegie Hall in New York City on Christmas Eve 1955. At the time the concert was a comeback for the group following the inclusion of the group on the entertainment industry blacklist. The album peaked at number 24 on the Billboard Top 200 in 1961.

The album represents the first half of that Carnegie Hall concert. A recording of the concert's second half was also released as an album, entitled The Weavers on Tour (1957, rereleased 1970).

== Track listing ==
1. "Darling Corey" (Traditional, arranged by Gilbert, Hays, Hellerman) — 1:58
2. "Kisses Sweeter than Wine" (traditional, arranged by Gilbert, Hays, Hellerman) — 3:14
3. "Pay Me My Money Down" (Parrish) — 2:36
4. "Greensleeves" (Traditional) — 2:39
5. "Rock Island Line" (Lead Belly) — 2:19
6. "Around the World" (Gilbert, Hays, Hellerman) — 2:37
7. "Wimoweh" (Solomon Linda, arranged by Gilbert, Hays, Hellerman) — 1:46
8. "Venga Jaleo" (Brooks) — 2:09
9. "Suliram (I'll Be There)" (Campbell, Engvick) — 2:05
10. "Shalom Chaverim" (Gilbert, Hays, Hellerman) — 2:02
11. "Lonesome Traveler" (Hays) — 1:59
12. "I Know Where I'm Going" (Traditional, arranged by Gilbert, Hays, Hellerman) — 1:51
13. "Woody's Rag/900 Miles" (Woody Guthrie) — 1:34
14. "Sixteen Tons" (Merle Travis) — 2:03
15. "Follow the Drinking Gourd" (Gilbert, Hays, Hellerman ...) — 2:09
16. "When the Saints Go Marching In" (Traditional) 2:15
17. "I've Got a Home in That Rock" (Gilbert, Hays, Hellerman) — 1:48
18. "Hush Little Baby" (Campbell) — 1:03
19. "Go Where I Send Thee (One for the Little Bitty Baby)" (Traditional, arranged by Gilbert, Hays, Hellerman) — 2:35
20. "Goodnight, Irene" (Lead Belly, Lomax) — 4:02

== Charts ==
year	chart	peak
1961	Billboard Pop Albums	24

== Personnel ==
=== The Weavers ===
- Ronnie Gilbert - vocals (alto)
- Lee Hays - vocals (bass), arrangements
- Fred Hellerman - vocals (baritone), guitar
- Pete Seeger - vocals (tenor), arrangements, banjo

=== Other ===
- Nancy Toff - liner notes

== Releases ==
year	format	label	catalog #
1957	LP	Vanguard	9010
1970	LP	Vanguard	VSD-76533
1984	LP	Vanguard	VMS-73101
1984	CS	Vanguard	CVM-73101
1988	CD	Vanguard	VMD-73101
