= Shalom chaverim =

Traditional Hebrew folk song

"Shalom chaverim" שלום חברים
- Round
- English: Peace, friends
- Text: traditional
- Language: Hebrew
- Melody: passed orally

"Shalom chaverim" (Hebrew: שלום חברים, "Peace, friends") is a Hebrew traditional folk song that can be sung as a round in four parts. It is a song of farewell, but has often been used advocating for peace. It was translated into several languages including English and German, and became popular abroad, also used for peace demonstrations and memorial events.

== History ==
"Shalom chaverim" is a Hebrew folk song which can be sung as a round in four parts. It is traditional, with unknown origin, possibly going back to the Habonim Labor Zionist Youth movement. The song expresses wishes for peace and well-being for a farewell, but has often been used advocating for peace, especially at memorial events remembering Jewish victims of the Holocaust and anti-semitic violence. It has been included in 37 hymnals.

"Shalom chaverim" has been adapted to be sung in other languages, such as English, "Farewell, good friends" and "Shalom, my friends", and German, "Der Friede des Herrn geleite euch" (The peace of the Lord be your guide). The song became popular and remains popular, often sung in Hebrew in foreign countries.

== Text and music ==
The short text deals with the topics of departure of friends and peace, suitable for gatherings, celebrations and ceremonies that involve parting. It expresses unity and friendship.

The tune, in D minor, has eight measures, with entrances after 2 measures.

The melody has been described as simplistic and suitable for children.

== Recordings ==
"Shalom chaverim" was recorded by the vocal folk music quartet the Weavers live in Carnegie Hall on Christmas Eve 1955, in an arrangement by member Fred Hellerman and released in 1957.
