= John Greenway (folklorist) =

American author, singer and scholar

John Greenway (15 December 1919 – 15 October 1991) was born Johannes Groeneweg in Liverpool, England. He was a noted author, singer and scholar who focused on American folk songs of protest.

== Academic career ==
Greenway served in the American Army in World War II and worked for a while as a carpenter and contractor. He graduated from University of Pennsylvania at the age of 28, and received his Ph.D. there in 1951. His dissertation on "American Folksongs of Social and Economic Protest." was later published as American Folksongs of Protest (University of Pennsylvania Press 1953), and was the standard work in the field for 40 years. He also studied protest folk songs in Australia. He recorded The Great American Bum and Other Hobo and Migratory Workers' Songs, and American Industrial Folksongs, both released by Riverside Records in 1995. In the 1950s he was a Professor of English at the University of Denver.

He authored or edited 19 books, wrote hundreds of articles and reviews, and was for many years editor of the Journal of American Folklore, Southwestern Lore, and Western Folklore (acting).

Popular works by Greenway include The Inevitable Americans (1964) and Literature Among the Primitives (1964). Many consider his best work to be Down Among the Wild Men, an account of his studies among the Aborigines of Australia, a people he greatly admired, and indeed found to be superior to the decadent white man of the Western world. This book was one time a Book of the Month Club selection.

He was professor of anthropology from the late 1960s through the 1970s at the University of Colorado Boulder, at times angering the establishment there. A former left-wing protest singer who had recorded talking blues critical of the administration of Republican president Dwight D. Eisenhower, during this time he wrote prolifically for conservative magazine The National Review. His columns remain highly controversial; after a 1969 column in defense of the genocide of Native Americans (in which he wrote, “Did the United States destroy the American Indian? No, but it should have.”), he responded to a threatening letter from a Native critic in a mock-pidgin dialect, saying that the “[C]hicken tracks of red brother ... makeum paleface heart heavy.”

== Musical career ==
Greenway recorded his first album, American Industrial Folksongs, in 1955. He was also a collector and performer of songs in the talking blues genre, and in 1958 he released the album Talking Blues, a collection of 15 songs which he had recorded and annotated. His fifth and final album was released in 1961.

=== Discography ===
- 1955: American Industrial Folksongs, Riverside Records 12-607
- 1956: The Great American Bum: Hobo And Migratory Workers' Songs, Riverside Records (RLP 12-619)
- 1958: Talking Blues, Folkways Records
- 1960: Australian Folksongs And Ballads, Folkways Records (FW 8718)
- 1961: The Cat Came Back And Other Fun Songs, Prestige International (13011)
