= I Will Lift Up Mine Eyes =

Adolphus Hailstork’s I Will Lift Up Mine Eyes is a cantata for a tenor soloist in three sections.

== Background ==
According to the 1997 music score, Hailstork composed this piece in memory of Undine Smith Moore. The instrumentation includes a flute, oboe, B flat clarinet, bassoon, F horn, C trumpet, trombone, timpani, strings, and percussionist. “I Will Lift Up Mine Eyes” is SATB for a chorus, and features a tenor soloist in all three sections of the composition. The title of this composition originates from Psalm 121, which discusses trust in the Lord, for He will keep you from all harm.

== Sections ==
=== Section 1: "I Will Lift Up Mine Eyes" ===
The lyrics of this piece is taken directly from Psalm 121 (KJV).

=== Section 2: "How Long?" ===
The lyrics of this section is inspired by the text of Psalm 13 (NEB). The last verse, in which the soprano and alto voices sing “I will lift up mine eyes” aids with the transition into section 3 of the composition.

How long, O Lord? How long?
How long, O Lord, will Thou forget me? How long will Thou hide Thy face from me?
How long? How long must I suffer anguish in my soul and grief in my heart?
How long, O Lord? Look now and answer me, O Lord.
Give light, O Lord, give light to my eyes, lest I sleep the sleep of death.
I will lift up mine eyes to the hills from whence cometh my help.

=== Section 3: "The Lord is My Shepherd, Alleluia" ===
Similar to the first section of the cantata, the lyrics of “The Lord is My Shepherd, Alleluia” originate from Psalm 23 (KJV). This piece features rhythmic and legato singing. A beautiful blend of soprano and tenor voices begin the piece, setting the tone and creating an aura of peace and contentment.
