= Tiny Hands =

Song by Fiona Apple
- Length: 1:02
- Songwriter: Fiona Apple
- Producer: Michael Whalen

"Tiny Hands" (full title: "We Don't Want Your Tiny Hands, Anywhere Near Our Underpants") is a protest song by Fiona Apple, released on SoundCloud days prior to the 2017 Women's March (January 21, 2017), for which the song was created.

== Composition and recording ==
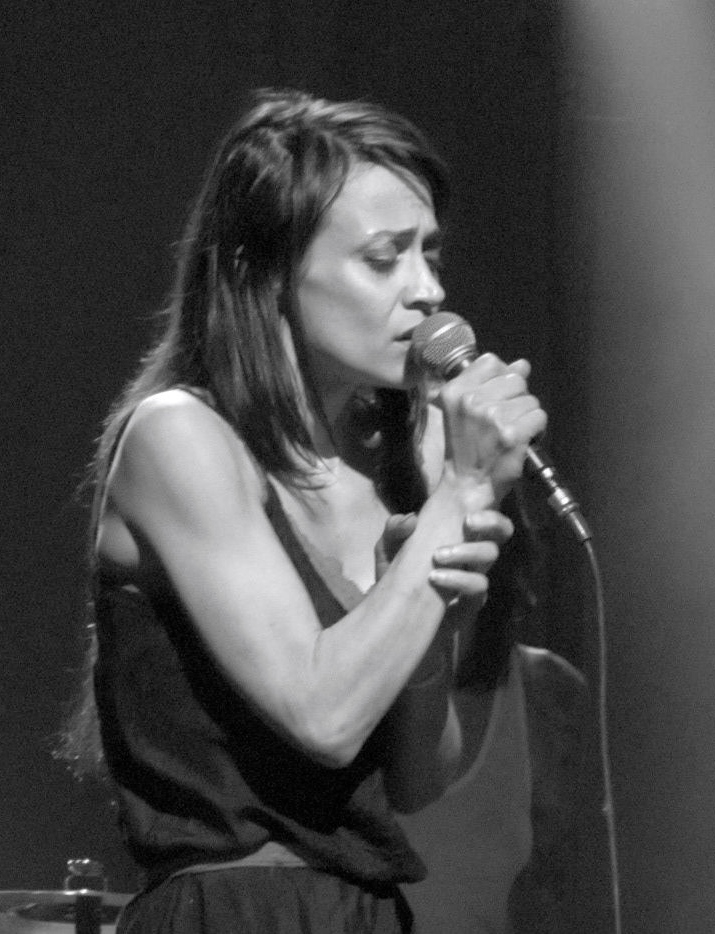
Fiona Apple in 2012

During the one-minute long chant, Apple repeats, "We don't want your tiny hands / anywhere near our underpants". The track, which was produced by Michael Whalen, also includes a sample of Donald Trump's comments from the Donald Trump and Billy Bush recording, in which he boasts about grabbing the body parts of women.

Apple recorded the song on her phone. "Tiny Hands" features Apple's voice "mixed over chunky synth drums and a sample of Trump bragging about grabbing women in the crotch".

== Reception ==
"Tiny Hands" has been called the "unofficial anthem" for the 2017 Women's March. New York Daily News described the song as "clever and succinct", and The New Yorker's Carrie Battan called the song "blunt and infectious". David Hajdu of The Nation said of the song: "It's a forceful recording with a message of resistance expressed in direct and disturbingly intimate terms, in which Apple addresses not only Trump's individual transgressions, but also his threat to women's reproductive rights and the sovereignty of women more broadly. Needless to say, it resonates best when it's sung by women, though it leaves a great many Trumpian threats for other songs to take up."

== See also ==
- Donald Trump (Last Week Tonight with John Oliver)
- Donald Trump Access Hollywood tape
- Donald Trump in music
- Donald Trump sexual misconduct allegations
- Protest songs in the United States
- Protests against Donald Trump
