= American Roots Music =

2001 film by Jim Brown

- Directed by: Jim Brown
- Starring: Arlo Guthrie; B.B. King; Bonnie Raitt; Pete Seeger
- Narrated by: Kris Kristofferson
- Country of origin: United States

Production
- Producer: Jim Brown

Original release
- Network: PBS
- Release: October 29 – November 19, 2001

American Roots Music is a 2001 multi-part documentary film that explores the historical roots of American Roots music through footage and performances by the creators of the movement: Folk, Country, Blues, Gospel, Bluegrass, and many others.

This PBS film series is available as an 'in-class' teaching tool.

Notable musicians that appear in this documentary are:

- Kris Kristofferson (as narrator)
- Bonnie Raitt
- Robbie Robertson
- Bob Dylan
- Eddie Vedder
- Mike Seeger
- Ricky Skaggs
- Marty Stuart
- Rufus Thomas
- Doc Watson
- James Cotton
- Bela Fleck
- Douglas B. Green
- Arlo Guthrie
- Flaco Jiménez
- B.B. King
- Bruce Springsteen
- Steven Van Zandt
- Robert Mirabal
- Keb' Mo'
- Willie Nelson
- Sam Phillips
- Bernice Johnson Reagon
- Keith Richards
- Earl Scruggs
- Ralph Stanley
