= Michael Whalen (composer) =

American composer

- Born: December 2, 1965 (age 60); New York City, New York, United States
- Genres: Film scores; Jingles
- Occupation: Composer
- Website: www.michaelwhalen.com

Michael Whalen (born December 2, 1965) is a composer of over 650 television and film scores and thousands of advertising jingles. He has won two Emmy Awards and his works are featured in places from TV shows to audiobooks. Projects include the 2011 human trafficking film Cargo and short films for Disney. As a recording artist and producer, his solo piano recording "All the Things I Could Not Say" was released in 2013, and he performs in NYC frequently, where he is an adjunct professor at The City College of New York, and the Clive Davis Institute of Recorded Music at the Tisch School of the Arts at New York University. Whalen is represented and published by Warner/Chappell Music.

== Early life ==
Michael was born in Long Island, NY, to author, columnist, economist, Presidential adviser and lobbyist Richard J. Whalen and art dealer and author Joan M. Whalen. The family moved to Washington, D.C. when he was two years old.

Whalen started playing the piano at the age of three, and began formal lessons on drums when he was five. Influenced by rock, progressive music, early "ambient" music and fusion, he experimented with many different styles of music into his teens. In the summer of 1980, Whalen found himself playing percussion with the Maryland all-state orchestra, second keyboards in a well known Washington "Go-Go" band, and drums in a garage-style punk band. In the fall of 1980, he went to boarding school for high school at St. Andrew's School in Middletown, Delaware. During high school, Whalen wrote his first music, switched his primary instrument from percussion to keyboards, and made his first studio recordings and first self produced recordings on a cassette 4-track machine. In 1982, he produced and released his first "single" with singer/songwriter and guitarist Jim Steed.

In May 1987, Whalen attended the Berklee College of Music in Boston (from 1984 - 1985) and the University of Maryland/College Park (1985 - 1987) and moved to New York City. After recording hundreds of tracks in his 8-track basement studio and throughout the Washington-metro area, Whalen moved to New York City.

== Career ==
Michael's first job was working at Elias Associates (later it was called Elias Arts) as an assistant. Elias was one of the busiest music production companies in the world in the 1980s and 1990s, and Whalen immersed himself in the state-of-the-art technology available in the studios at Elias at night. Their studios featured the Synclavier Digital Audio System which became a huge part of Whalen's later career. It was at Elias that Whalen did his first sound design and composition of national advertisements (Pepsi, Coca-Cola, BMW, Nutrasweet, IBM, Ford and many others). He also had an opportunity to work with recording artists Duran Duran, John Waite and Glamour Camp as assistant, programmer and sound designer.

Working for many of the top music companies, Whalen did many hundreds of commercials from 1989 to 1995. In 1990, Michael scored his first major television series entitled "Childhood" which was broadcast on PBS in the United States. This was the first of nearly 70 multi-part series he has composed music for and the first of the nearly 600-plus television shows he has worked on. In 1995, Whalen opened his own music production company, Michael Whalen Music, LTD. During these years, Whalen scored dozens of films for National Geographic, Discovery, The History Channel, ESPN, PBS and many others. In 1997, he won his first Emmy award for his work on HBO's "How Do You Spell God?" In 1998, Whalen wrote the theme for ABC News' "Good Morning America". In 1998, he moved to the suburbs of Boston where he built a new studio in his attic.

=== 2000 to present ===
In 2002, Whalen was an associate professor at the Berklee College of Music in Boston. He completed work on the soundtrack for the film Veronika Decides to Die starring Sarah Michelle Gellar in 2008. While living in New York City, he was appointed as an adjunct lecturer at City College of New York in January 2009. Also in 2009, Whalen became an adjunct professor at the Clive Davis Institute of Recorded Music at New York University in June 2009. The piano solo "My Linda," from his album Dancing In Black & White, provided the introductory music for all 12 volumes of Anthony Powell's A Dance to the Music of Time as recorded by Simon Vance for Audible Modern Vanguard.

In 2009, Whalen released his first EP featuring him as a vocalist, titled The Road of Ghosts.

In 2017, Whalen produced "Tiny Hands", a protest song written for the Inauguration of Donald Trump and the Women's March on Washington and performed by Fiona Apple.

== Selected discography ==
- Mike Whalen/Jim Steed "Get a Little Closer/Don't Let Go" (Single) [Artist, Producer, Composer] 1984 Patch Records
- Michael Whalen "Sea Power: A Global Journey" (Soundtrack)[Artist, Producer, Composer] 1993 Narada Cinema
- Michael Whalen "Phantom of the Forest" (Soundtrack) [Artist, Producer, Composer] 1994 Narada Cinema
- Michael Whalen "Great African Moments" (Soundtrack) [Artist, Producer, Composer] 1994 Narada Cinema
- VARIOUS "Christmas Blessings" (Holiday Compilation)[Artist, Producer, Arranger] 1995 Narada
- David Arkenstone "Quest of the Dream Warrior" [Producer, Arranger, Conductor] 1995 Narada
- Michael Whalen "Forever Wild" (Soundtrack) [Artist, Producer, Composer] 1996 Narada
- Michael Whalen "Night Scenes" [Artist, Producer, Composer] 1996 Hearts of Space
- Michael Whalen "Afraid of Thunder" [Artist, Producer, Composer] 1996 Helicon Classical
- Jim Brickman "Picture This" [Producer, Arranger] 1997 Windham Hill
- Open Door "North From Riverside" [Artist, Producer, Composer] 1997 Helicon Jazz
- VARIOUS "Songs Without Words" (Collection) [Artist, Producer, Composer] 1997 Windham Hill
- VARIOUS "Grand Piano" (Compilation)[Artist, Producer, Composer] 1998 Narada
- Michael Whalen "Titanic: Anatomy of a Disaster" [Artist, Producer, Composer] 1998 Centaur Records
- VARIOUS "Poké Mon: 2 B A Master" (Soundtrack) [Composer, Producer] 1999 Koch/4 Kids
- Michael Whalen "The Softest Touch" [Artist, Producer, Composer] 1999 EverSound
- Michael Whalen "The Shadows of October" [Composer, Executive Producer] 1999 Arabesque Classical
- VARIOUS "Tidings of Joy" [Artist, Producer, Composer] 1999 EverSound
- Michael Whalen "The Border of Dusk" [Artist, Producer, Composer] 2000 Koch Jazz
- VARIOUS "Reel Life: the private music of film composers" (Collection) [Executive Producer] 2000 Arabesque Classical
- Jim Steed "Til' I Found You" [Composer, Producer, Arranger] 2000 JSM
- Michael Whalen "Lost Liners" (Soundtrack) [Artist, Producer, Composer] 2000 MWM/Orchard
- Michael Whalen "Mysterious Ways"[Artist, Producer, Composer] 2001 Koch Jazz
- VARIOUS "Rare Requests: Volume 2" (Compilation) [Artist, Producer, Composer] 2001 Q/Atlantic
- VARIOUS "20 Years of Narada Piano" (Compilation) [Artist, Producer, Composer] 2001 Narada/EMI
- VARIOUS "Yu-Gi-Oh: Music to Duel By" (Soundtrack) [Artist, Producer, Composer] 2002 Koch/4 Kids
- Michael Whalen "The Shape of Life" (Soundtrack)[Artist, Producer, Composer] 2002 Alchemy
- VARIOUS "Earth Songs/Precious Waters" (Artist, Producer, Composer) 2003 Narada
- Michael Whalen "Night Scenes" [re-issue][Artist, Producer, Composer] 2003 Alchemy
- Michael Whalen "From Conception to Birth" (Soundtrack)[Artist, Producer, Composer] 2004 Valley/Cherry Lane
- Michael Whalen "Like Rain Through My Hands" [Artist, Producer, Composer] 2004 MWM/Orchard
- Jon Durant "Things Behind the Sun" [Musician] 2004 Alchemy
- Michael Whalen "Jazzworks Volume 1" (Collection) [Artist, Producer, Composer] 2004 MWM/Orchard
- Michael Whalen "Slavery and the Making of America" (Soundtrack) [Artist, Producer, Composer] 2005 Valley Entertainment
- Michael Whalen "My Secret Heart" [Artist, Producer, Composer] 2005 Narada
- Michael Whalen "Music for the Natural World" (Collection) [Artist, Producer, Composer] 2005 MWM
- Michael Whalen "Lullabies for Grown-ups" (Collection) [Artist, Producer, Composer] 2005 MWM
- Jim Steed "Fall" (EP) [Composer, Producer] 2007 Jim Steed Music
- Michael Whalen "The Other Coast"[Artist, Producer, Composer] 2007 MWM/Spout
- Andiamo "Love, From Italy" (Soundtrack) [Composer, Producer, Arranger] 2007 Denon Classical
- Michael Whalen "The Road of Ghosts" (EP) [Artist, Producer, Songwriter] 2009 MWM/Spout
- Kristin Hoffman "The Waking" (EP) [Composer, Producer, Arranger] 2009 KHM
- Michael Whalen "Dancing in Black and White:The Best of Michael Whalen" (Compilation) [Artist, Producer, Composer] 2010 EverSound
- Michael Whalen "Lights Along the Highway" [Composer, Producer, Conductor] 2010 Arabesque Classical
- Supa' K "Fun Fun Fun Fun Fun with Supa' K" "Producer, Co-Composer" 2011 Orchard Children's Music
- Michael Whalen "The Sea of Tranquility" [Artist, Producer, Composer] 2012 MWM/Spout
- Michael Whalen "All The Things I Wanted To Say" [Artist, Producer, Composer] 2014 MWM/Spout
- Bala Brothers "Bala Brothers" (Soundtrack) "Producer, Arranger" 2015 Parlaphone
- Michael Whalen "You Are My Home" [Artist, Producer, Composer] 2015 MWM/Spout
- Azure "Je Réve" [single] [Artist, Producer, Composer] 2016
- Michael Whalen "Dream Cycle" [Artist, Producer, Composer] 2017 Valley Entertainment
- Michael Whalen "Kiss The Quiet" [Artist, Producer, Composer] 2018 MWM/Spout
- Michael Whalen "Cupid Blindfolded" [Artist, Producer, Composer] 2019 Solace/Real Music
- Michael Whalen "Sacred Spaces" [Artist, Producer, Composer] 2020 Solace/myndstream
- BlueMonk/Michael Whalen "Karmic Dreams" [Artist, Producer, Co-Composer] 2020 Solace/myndstream
- Michael Whalen "Future Shock" [Artist, Producer, Composer] 2021 MWM/Spout
- Michael Whalen "Imaginary Trains" [Artist, Producer, Composer] 2022 MWM/Spout
- Michael Whalen "Our April Tigers" [Artist, Producer, Composer] 2022 MWM/Spout
- Michael Whalen "Walk in Beauty, Like the Night" [Artist, Producer, Composer] 2023 MWM/Spout
- Michael Whalen "Brokenhearted Lopsided Blues" [Artist, Producer, Composer] 2024 MWM/Spout
- Michael Whalen "Watercolor Sky" [Artist, Producer, Composer] 2024 MWM/Spout
