= Jim Brown (director) =

American film director (born 1950)

- Born: James Bradford Brown; June 7, 1950 (age 76); New York City, New York, U.S.
- Education: Tisch School of the Arts
- Occupation: Film director

James Bradford Brown (born June 7, 1950) is an American film director, primarily known for his work in documentary film. He has won four Emmys, most recently for Pete Seeger: The Power of Song. He has directed and produced four feature documentaries that received theatrical distribution. He heads Jim Brown Productions, LLC and Ginger Group Productions, Inc., production companies specializing in cultural and social documentaries and music concerts.

He studied film at Tisch School of the Arts, and is an associate professor at New York University's Kanbar Institute of Film and Television at Tisch School of the Arts.

Brown has also produced and directed works for film and television, most notably We Shall Overcome, narrated by Harry Belafonte, Peter Seeger: The Power of Song; 50 Years with Peter, Paul and Mary; Free to Rock; Billy Joel - A Matter of Trust: The Bridge to Russia; Alice's Restaurant 50th Anniversary Concert; Peter, Paul, and Mary: Carry It on - A Musical Legacy; Don McLean: An American Troubadour; Legends of Folk: The Village Scene; American Roots Music, a four-part series that aired on PBS; Songs of the Civil War, a PBS special co-produced by Ken Burns; In the Hank Williams Tradition, a musical tribute co-produced by the Country Music Hall of Fame and Museum; and A Vision Shared: A Tribute to Woody Guthrie and Leadbelly, a Showtime and PBS special. He has also directed and produced shows for the Travel Channel and Sesame Street.

== List of work ==
=== Television ===
- Free to Rock (2015)
- Alice's Restaurant 50th Anniversary Concert (2015)
- 50 Years with Peter, Paul and Mary (2014)
- Billy Joel - A Matter of Trust: The Bridge to Russia (2013)
- Woody Guthrie at 100! Live from the Kennedy Center (2013)
- Don McLean: An American Troubadour (2012)
- Legends of Folk: The Village Scene (2011)
- Luxury Yachts (Travel Channel) (2007)
- American Roots Music: Chicago (2006)
- Great American Lake Homes (Travel Channel) (2005)
- Great American Ranches (Travel Channel) (2005)
- Outrageous Beach Homes (Travel Channel) (2005)
- Fantastic Houseboats (Travel Channel) (2004)
- Super Yachts (Travel Channel) (2004)
- Outrageous Trucks (Travel Channel) (2004)
- Luxurious Log Homes (Travel Channel) (2004)
- Peter, Paul and Mary: Carry It On – A Musical Legacy (2004)
- The Three Pickers (2003)
- American Roots Music: A Portrait of Ann and Marc Savoy (2004)
- American Roots Music (2001)
- An Evening with Harry Belafonte and Friends (1998)
- In The Spotlight: Mary Chapin Carpenter at Wolf Trap (1995)
- Child of Mine (1994)
- Sesame Street: Big Bird Postcards (1993)
- Songs of the Civil War (1991)
- Pete Seeger's Family Concert (1991)
- Sesame Street: Cuban American Segments (1990)
- A Vision Shared: A Tribute to Woody Guthrie and Leadbelly (1988)
- Sesame Street: The Navajo Segments (1989)
- In the Hank Williams Tradition (1989)
- We Shall Overcome (1988)
- Woody Guthrie: Hard Travelin' (1984)
- Woody Guthrie All Star Tribute Concert (1970) for P.B.S.

=== Feature films ===
- Holly Near: Singing For Our Lives (2018)
- Pete Seeger: The Power of Song (2007)
- Isn't This a Time! (2006)
- A Musical Passage (1984)
- The Weavers: Wasn't That a Time! (1981)

== Emmy Awards ==
- Pete Seeger: The Power of Song in 2008 for outstanding non-fiction series
- Sesame Street: The Navajo Segments in 1991 for best children's series
- We Shall Overcome in 1989 for documentary
- The Weavers: Wasn't That a Time! in 1984 for directing
