= The Weavers: Wasn't That a Time! =

1981 documentary film directed by Jim Brown

- Directed by: Jim Brown
- Produced by: Ginger Brown; Harold Leventhal; George Stoney
- Starring: Pete Seeger; Lee Hays; Ronnie Gilbert; Fred Hellerman
- Cinematography: Daniel Duchovny; Phil Gries; Tom Hurwitz
- Edited by: Paul Barnes
- Music by: The Weavers
- Distributed by: United Artists Classics
- Release date: March 7, 1982
- Running time: 78 minutes
- Country: United States
- Language: English

The Weavers: Wasn't That a Time! is a 1982 documentary film by Jim Brown.

== Summary ==
It chronicles the legendary folk group The Weavers and the events leading up to the band’s 1980 reunion concert at Carnegie Hall which would soon be the last time with the original lineup.

== Reception and legacy ==
Gene Siskel and Roger Ebert gave the film two thumbs up to the point where the latter choose it as the #10 choice on his list for the best films of that year.

The film was also the inspiration for the 2003 mockumentary film A Mighty Wind.

== Awards ==
=== Won ===
- Kansas City Film Critics Circle Awards 1983:
  - Best Documentary
- American Cinema Editors 1984:
  - Eddie Award - Best Edited Documentary

=== Nominated ===
- BAFTA Awards 1983:
  - Flaherty Documentary Award - Jim Brown

== See also ==
- List of films featuring diabetes
- American roots music
- McCarthyism
