= Sing Out March On =

2017 song by Joshuah Campbell

"Sing Out/March On"

Song by Joshuah Campbell
- Written: November 2015
- Released: July 4, 2017
- Studio: The Soul Shop, Medford, MA
- Genre: Protest song
- Songwriter: Joshuah Campbell
- Producers: Elio DeLuca, Joshuah Campbell, Ethan Simon

Sing Out/March On is a song by Joshuah Campbell released in 2017. Both the musical style and the lyrics call back to the songs of the civil rights era. The song was notably performed during Harvard University's 2018 commencement ceremony in honor of commencement speaker John Lewis.

== Inspiration and first performance ==
In November of 2015, Harvard students held widespread demonstrations and marches in support of the Black Lives Matter movement. During this time, Campbell first conceived and performed Sing Out/March On. He considers writing and performing this song his most personally gratifying experience at Harvard. At the time, he imagined the song would soon lose its relevance, but realized that as we continue to find ourselves with "more and more reasons to fight injustice and oppression its call to action still rings true".

== Subsequent performances and recordings ==
Campbell officially released a recording of the song on July 4, 2017, with himself as lead vocalist backed by a seven-piece band. All profits from the song went to benefit the Southern Poverty Law Center.

In May 2018 Joshuah Campbell backed by a small vocal ensemble performed an a cappella rendition of the song during Harvard's 2018 Commencement Ceremony as a tribute to John Lewis, who was the commencement speaker that year.

A similar small a cappella ensemble performed the piece with Campbell on CBS Sunday Morning in October of 2018.

On the evening of November 5, 2018, a chorus of over 600 singers performed the song at the Vietnam Veterans Memorial in Washington, DC as part of the Harmony Project's effort to get out the vote on the eve of the mid-term election.

In December 2018, the Dorothy Cotton Jubilee Singers performed the song as part of their Holiday Concert at Ithaca College's Ford Hall. The soloist was Maria Ellis-Jordan.

== Composer ==
Joshuah Brian Campbell is a 2016 graduate of Harvard University originally from Cheraw, South Carolina. He was named one of the twelve "most impressive students at Harvard" by Business Insider in 2016.
