= Ronnie Gilbert =

American folk singer, songwriter, actress and political activist (1926–2015)

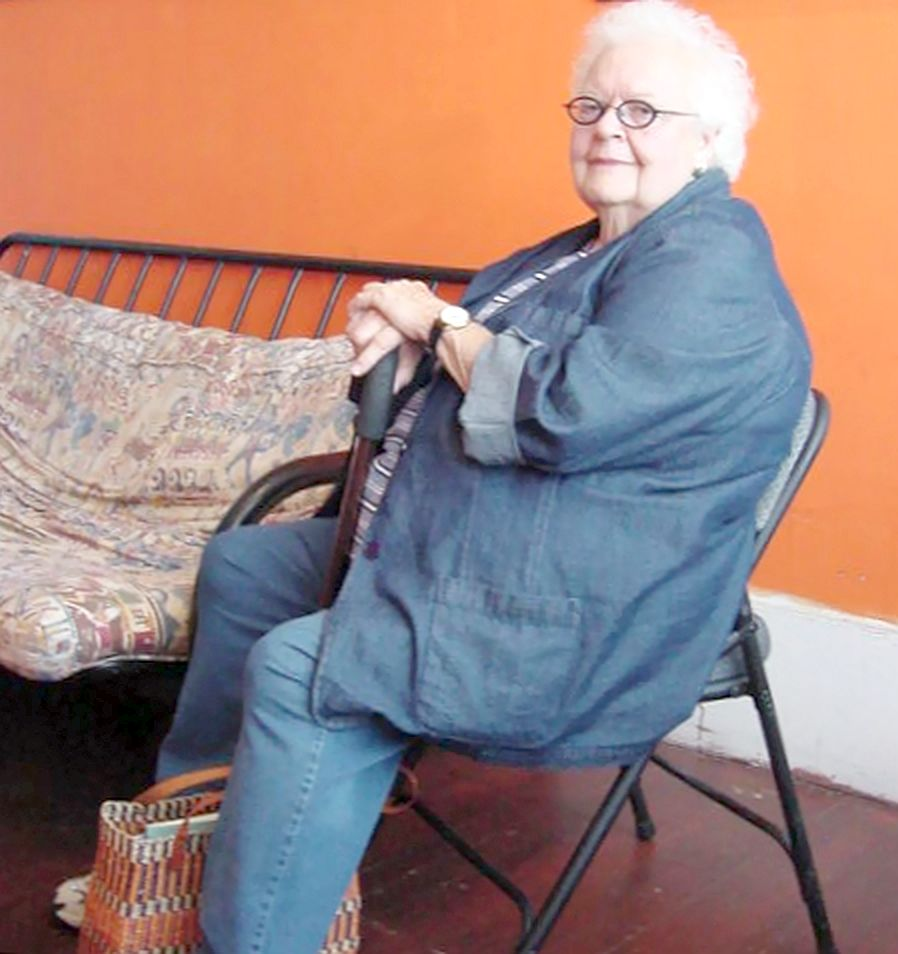
- Gilbert in August 2006
- Born: Ruth Alice Gilbert; September 7, 1926; Brooklyn, New York, U.S.
- Died: June 6, 2015 (aged 88); Mill Valley, California, U.S.
- Occupations: Musician; singer; songwriter; actress; political activist; psychotherapist
- Spouses: Martin Weg (m. 1950; div. 1959); Donna Korones (m. 2004)
- Children: 1
- Musical career
- Genres: American folk music; Protest music; Americana
- Instrument: Vocals
- Labels: Decca; RCA Victor; Vanguard; Mercury; Motivation; Redwood; Abbe Alice
- Formerly of: The Weavers

Ruth Alice "Ronnie" Gilbert (September 7, 1926 – June 6, 2015), was an American folk singer, songwriter, actress and political activist. She was one of the original members of the music quartet the Weavers, as a contralto with Pete Seeger, Lee Hays, and Fred Hellerman.

== Early life ==
Gilbert was born in Brooklyn, New York City and considered herself a native New Yorker her whole life. Her parents were Jewish immigrants from Eastern Europe. Her mother, Sarah, came from Warsaw, Poland and was a dressmaker and trade unionist. Her father, Charles Gilbert, came from Ukraine and was a factory worker.

From a young age, she had a strong sense of social justice and gave credit for this to her mother who had been involved with the Polish-Jewish Bund. She went to Anacostia High School and was almost expelled because of her resistance to participating in a blackface minstrel show with white students, citing Paul Robeson's "denunciations of racism." Gilbert came to Washington, D.C., during World War II at the age of 16, took a government job and joined a protest folk-singing group, the Priority Ramblers. She performed with this group before founding the Weavers with Pete Seeger. When she returned to New York, Gilbert became involved in organising the Office Workers' Union and worked for the Textile Workers' Union. She encountered Library of Congress folklorist Alan Lomax and Woody Guthrie and other folk singers.

== Career ==
Gilbert's singing was characterized as "a crystalline, bold contralto." Her voice is heard, blending with and rising over the others, in Weavers tracks such as "This Land Is Your Land", "If I Had a Hammer", "On Top of Old Smoky", "Goodnight, Irene", "Kisses Sweeter than Wine", and "Tzena, Tzena, Tzena".

The Weavers were an influential folk-singing group who were blacklisted in the early 1950s, during a period of widespread anti-communist hysteria, because of the group's left-wing sympathies. Following the Weavers' dissolution in 1953 due to the blacklist, she continued her activism on a personal level, traveling to Cuba in 1961 on a trip that brought her back to the United States on the very day that American travel to Cuba was banned. She also participated in the Parisian protests of 1968 after traveling to that country to work with British theatrical director Peter Brook.

In the early 1960s, she initiated a second career as an actress in Off-Broadway theater. In 1966 she was cast in the satirical play America Hurrah. In 1968 she appeared in a dramatic, non-musical role—the concentration camp survivor Mrs. Rosen—in the original Broadway production of Robert Shaw's play The Man in the Glass Booth. That same year Gilbert started obtaining small acting roles in film and television, which she would do off and on for the next two decades. Among her credits were Isadora (1968), Camera Three (1971), Club Life (1986), Crossing Delancey (1988), and Running on Empty (1988). In the 1990 TV documentary miniseries The Civil War by Ken Burns, she provided a variety of voices in nine of the episodes.

Gilbert moved to Berkeley in 1971, and began to learn and offer psychotherapy. The next year, she entered graduate school. By 1974, she had earned an MA in clinical psychology and worked as a therapist for several years. She later said that during this time she needed a change from her acting career. By then her daughter was grown up and Gilbert "fell into" therapy, including Gestalt, Freudian and Jungian practices.

=== Music with Holly Near and HARP ===
In 1974, Holly Near dedicated her album A Live Album to Gilbert. At the time, Near didn't even know if Gilbert was still alive, so she didn't ask her for permission. Gilbert found out about the dedication from her daughter and met Near soon after. This is how Gilbert describes meeting Near:

I told her about how her record was astonishing to me ... I was so moved. First I was kind of teed off about it and then ... I was just in tears the whole time, and figured out this has been going on while I haven't been looking ... This consciousness, this woman consciousness has been happening and was happening in music ... Of course, I loved her because she was ... the coming together of all the things I loved in music, from folk music to Broadway ... she had that kind of delivery and voice and she could handle pretty much anything. It was like she had the social consciousness in a new contemporary way that the Weavers had.

In 1980, part of The Weavers: Wasn't That a Time! was filmed in the loft Gilbert was living in. The film-maker left the camera running after the Near interview, capturing Near and Gilbert as they sang "Hay Una Mujer." That song was left in the film and some of the audience called Near's record company to see if/when she and Gilbert would be touring. Gilbert says that this "jump started [her and Near] into a musical partnership." They toured together nationally in 1983 for their first live album, Lifeline.

Near and Gilbert joined Arlo Guthrie and Pete Seeger for the 1984 quartet album HARP (an acronym for "Holly, Arlo, Ronnie, and Pete"). During this tour, Gilbert met and fell in love with her future wife, Donna Korones. She came out as a lesbian soon after she started dating Korones.

In 1985, Gilbert performed with Near, Guthrie, and Seeger at the Ohio State Fair. She performed at the 10th Michigan Womyn's Music Festival and the first Redwood Festival with Near. She also performed at the Vancouver Folk Festival, the National Women's Music Festival, and Sisterfire.

In 1986, she and Near recorded Singing With You.

During that period Gilbert wrote and appeared in a one-woman show about Mary Harris "Mother" Jones, the Irish-American activist and labor organizer, and in a second work based on author Studs Terkel's book, Coming of Age. In her portrayal of Jones, Gilbert aimed to portray a woman who was at once "spunky and sarcastic, fearless and opinionated", and the show's songs, most of which were written by Gilbert, provide an insight into a time of resistance to injustice in the United States.

=== Later music and activism ===
In 1991, Gilbert recorded "Lincoln and Liberty" and "When Johnny Comes Marching Home" for the compilation album, Songs of the Civil War.

In 1992, she accompanied the Vancouver Men's Chorus on the song "Music in My Mother's House" from their album Signature.

At the age of 10, after hearing Paul Robeson sing for the first time, Gilbert commented: "Songs are dangerous, songs are subversive and can change your life."

She continued to tour and appear in plays, folk festivals, and music festivals well into her 80s. She also continued her protest work, participating in groups such as Women in Black to protest Israeli occupation of Palestinian territories in addition to United States policies in the Middle East.

In 2006, the Weavers received a Grammy Lifetime Achievement Award. Gilbert and Hellerman accepted the award. Pete Seeger was unable to attend the ceremony, and Hays had died in 1981. Seeger died in 2014.

== Personal life ==
Gilbert was married to Martin Weg from 1950 until 1959, and the couple have one daughter, Lisa (born 1952). Their marriage ended in divorce. In 2004, when gay marriage was temporarily legalized in San Francisco, Gilbert married Donna Korones, her manager and partner of almost two decades. Gilbert moved to Caspar, California in 2006.

Gilbert died on June 6, 2015, at a nursing facility in Mill Valley, California, from natural causes, at age 88.
