= The Weavers =

American folk music quartet

Background information
- Origin: Greenwich Village, New York City, U.S.
- Genre: Folk
- Years active: 1948–1952, 1955–1964, 1980 (occasional reunions between 1964 and 1980)
- Labels: Decca, Vanguard, Loom
- Spinoff of: The Almanac Singers
- Past members: Ronnie Gilbert; Lee Hays; Fred Hellerman; Pete Seeger; Erik Darling; Frank Hamilton; Bernie Krause

The Weavers were an American folk music quartet based in the Greenwich Village area of New York City originally consisting of Lee Hays, Pete Seeger, Ronnie Gilbert, and Fred Hellerman. Founded in 1948, the group sang traditional folk songs from around the world, as well as blues, gospel music, children's songs, labor songs, and American ballads. The group sold millions of records at the height of their popularity, including the first folk song to reach No. 1 on popular music charts, their recording of Lead Belly's "Goodnight, Irene."

Despite their popularity, the Weavers were blacklisted during much of the 1950s. During the Red Scare, members of the group were followed by the FBI and denied recording and performance opportunities, with Seeger and Hays called in to testify before the House Committee on Un-American Activities.

Pete Seeger left the group in 1958. His tenor and banjo part was covered in succession by Erik Darling, Frank Hamilton and finally Bernie Krause until the group disbanded in 1964. Seeger discussed the history of folk music and the impact of The Weavers in an April 1963 interview on Folk Music Worldwide.

== History ==
=== Formation ===
In 1940, Lee Hays and Pete Seeger co-founded the Almanac Singers, which, along with American folk songs and ballads, promoted peace and isolationism in the years preceding World War II, working with the Communist Party-backed American Peace Mobilization (APM). The Almanacs featured many songs opposing entry into the war by the U.S. In June 1941, when Germany invaded the Soviet Union, the APM changed its name to the American People's Mobilization and followed the Party line by altering its focus to supporting U.S. entry into the war. The Almanacs supported the change and produced many pro-war songs urging the U.S. to fight on the side of the Allies. The Almanac Singers disbanded after the U.S. entered the war.

The Weavers were formed in November 1948 by Hays, Seeger, Ronnie Gilbert, and Fred Hellerman. At Hellerman's suggestion, the group took its name from a play by Gerhart Hauptmann, Die Weber (The Weavers 1892), depicting the uprising of the Silesian weavers in 1844.

=== Early career ===
After a period of being unable to find much paid work, they landed a steady and successful engagement at the Village Vanguard jazz club. This led to their discovery by arranger-bandleader Gordon Jenkins and their signing with Decca Records. The group had a big hit in 1950 with Lead Belly's "Goodnight, Irene", backed with the 1941 song "Tzena, Tzena, Tzena", which in turn became a best seller. The recording stayed at number one on the charts for 13 weeks, the first folk song arrangement to achieve such success. "Goodnight, Irene" sold one million copies in 1950. (Pete Seeger later wrote that total sales were about two million records.) In keeping with the style of the time, these and other early Weavers' releases had violins and orchestration added behind the group. For example, on their hit, "Lonesome Traveler," which Lee Hays wrote, they were backed by Jenkins and his orchestra

Because of the deepening Red Scare of the early 1950s, their manager Pete Cameron advised them not to sing their most explicitly political songs and to avoid performing at "progressive" venues and events. Because of this, some folk song fans criticized them for watering down their beliefs and commercializing their singing style. But the Weavers felt it was worth it to get their songs before the public, and to avoid the explicit type of commitment which had led to the demise of the Almanacs. The new approach proved a success, leading to many bookings and increased demand for the group's recordings.

The successful concerts and hit recordings of the Weavers helped introduce to new audiences such folk revival standards as "On Top of Old Smoky" (with guest vocalist Terry Gilkyson), Woody Guthrie's 1935 "So Long, It's Been Good to Know Yuh" (the B side of "Lonesome Traveler", which reached number 4 in 1951), "Follow the Drinking Gourd", "Kisses Sweeter than Wine", Tony Saletan's adaptation of "Michael, Row the Boat Ashore", "The Wreck of the John B" (a/k/a "Sloop John B"), "Rock Island Line", "The Midnight Special", "Pay Me My Money Down", "Darling Corey" and "Wimoweh". The Weavers encouraged sing-alongs in their concerts, and sometimes Seeger would shout out the lyrics in advance of each line, in lining out style.

Film footage of the Weavers is relatively scarce. The group appeared as a specialty act in a B-movie musical, Disc Jockey (1951), and filmed five of their record hits that same year for TV producer Lou Snader: "Goodnight, Irene", "Tzena, Tzena, Tzena", "So Long", "Around the World", and "The Roving Kind".

=== McCarthy era ===
During the 1950s Red Scare, Pete Seeger and Lee Hays were identified as Communist Party USA members by FBI informant Harvey Matusow (who later recanted). Both were called to testify to the House Committee on Un-American Activities in 1955. Hays asserted his rights under the Fifth Amendment, which allows people not to give evidence against themselves. Seeger also refused to answer, but claimed justification under the First Amendment, the first to do so after the conviction of the Hollywood Ten in 1950. Seeger was found guilty of contempt and placed under restrictions by the court pending appeal, but in 1961 his conviction was overturned on technical grounds. Because Seeger was among those listed in the entertainment industry blacklist publication Red Channels, all of the Weavers were placed under FBI surveillance and not allowed to perform on television or radio during the McCarthy era. Despite their enormous popularity, Decca Records terminated the Weavers' recording contract and deleted their records from its catalog in 1953. Their recordings were denied airplay, which curtailed their income from royalties. Right-wing and anti-Communist groups protested at their performances and harassed promoters. As a result, the group's economic viability diminished rapidly and in 1952 it disbanded. After this, Pete Seeger continued his solo career, although as with all of them, he continued to suffer from the effects of blacklisting.

=== Reunited and later reconstituted ===
In December 1955, the group reunited to play a sold-out concert at Carnegie Hall. The concert was a huge success. A recording of some of the concert, The Weavers at Carnegie Hall, was issued in 1957 by the independent Vanguard Records, and this led to their signing by that record label. (Additional selections from the 1955 Carnegie Hall concert were included on 1957's The Weavers on Tour.) By the late 1950s, folk music was surging in popularity and McCarthyism was fading. Yet it was not until the height of the 1960s that Seeger was able to end his blacklisting by appearing on the nationally broadcast CBS-TV variety show The Smothers Brothers Comedy Hour in 1967.

After the April 1957 LP release of the Carnegie Hall concert, the Weavers launched a month-long concert tour. That August, the group reassembled for a series of recording sessions for Vanguard. As Seeger's college concert bookings grew, the singer felt restricted by his obligations to the group. Vanguard booked the Weavers for a January 15, 1958, session to record a rock-and-roll single. The results were embarrassing and fueled Seeger's frustration. The following month Gilbert, Hays, and Hellerman overruled Seeger about recording a cigarette ad for a tobacco company. Seeger, opposed to the dangers of tobacco and discouraged by the group's apparent sell-out to commercial interests, decided to resign. After honoring their commitment to record the jingle, he left the group on March 3, 1958.

Seeger recommended Erik Darling of the Tarriers as his replacement. Darling remained with the group until June 1962, leaving to pursue a solo career and eventually forming the folk trio the Rooftop Singers. Frank Hamilton, who replaced Darling, stayed with the group nine months, giving his notice just before the Weavers celebrated the group's fifteenth anniversary with two nights of concerts at Carnegie Hall in March 1963. Folksinger Bernie Krause, later a pioneer in bringing the Moog synthesizer to popular music, was the last performer to occupy "the Seeger chair". The group disbanded in 1964, but Gilbert, Hellerman, and Hays occasionally reunited with Seeger during the next 16 years. In 1980, Lee Hays, ill and using a wheelchair, wistfully approached the original Weavers for one last get-together. Hays' informal picnic prompted a professional reunion and a triumphant return to Carnegie Hall on November 28, 1980, which was to be the group's last full performance. They appeared one final time in June 1981 at the Clearwater Festival, in an informal "rehearsal".

== Music style ==
In a 1968 interview, in response to claims that record companies found the Weavers difficult to classify, Seeger told the Pop Chronicles music documentary to "leave that up to the anthropologists, the folklorists. ... For you and me, the important thing is a song, a good song, a true song. ... Call it anything you want."

A documentary film, The Weavers: Wasn't That a Time! (1982), was released after the 1981 death of Hays. The film chronicled the history of the group, including the events leading up to their final reunion. Critic Roger Ebert gave the film four stars out of a possible four in his Chicago Sun-Times review and named it one of his top 10 films for 1982.

== After disbanding ==
Following the Weavers' dissolution, Ronnie Gilbert toured America as a soloist, and Fred Hellerman worked as a recording engineer and producer. Gilbert also performed and recorded with Holly Near, and then (in 1985) as "HARP," featuring Holly Near, Arlo Guthrie, Ronnie Gilbert, and Pete Seeger.

The group was inducted into the Vocal Group Hall of Fame in 2001. In February 2006, the Weavers received the Grammy Lifetime Achievement Award. Represented by members Ronnie Gilbert and Fred Hellerman, they struck a chord with the crowd as their struggles with political witch hunts during the 1950s were recounted. "If you can exist, and stay the course – not a course of blind obstinacy and faulty conception – but one of decency and good sense, you can outlast your enemies with your honor and integrity intact", Hellerman said. Some commentators see the reference to "blind obstinacy" as a veiled criticism of those who believed uncritically in all the actions of the Communist Party.

Lee Hays died in 1981, aged 67. His biography, Lonesome Traveler by Doris Willens, was published in 1988. Erik Darling died August 3, 2008, aged 74, in Chapel Hill, North Carolina, from lymphoma. After a long career in music and activism, Pete Seeger died at the age of 94 on January 27, 2014, in New York City. Ronnie Gilbert died at the age of 88 on June 6, 2015. Last-surviving founding member Fred Hellerman died at the age of 89 on September 1, 2016.

== Members ==
- Ronnie Gilbert – alto (1948–1952, 1955–1964, 1980; died 2015)
- Lee Hays – bass (1948–1952, 1955–1964, 1980; died 1981)
- Fred Hellerman – baritone, guitar (1948–1952, 1955–1964, 1980; died 2016)
- Pete Seeger – tenor, long-neck banjo (1948–1952, 1955–1958, 1980; died 2014)
- Erik Darling – tenor, banjo (1958–1962; died 2008)
- Frank Hamilton – tenor, guitar (1962–1963)
- Bernie Krause – tenor (1963–1964)

== Discography ==
Studio albums

- Folk Songs of America and Other Lands (1951)
- We Wish You a Merry Christmas (1951)
- The Weavers at Carnegie Hall (1957)
- On Tour (1957)
- Folk Songs Around the World (1959)
- The Weavers at Home (1959)
- Travelling On With the Weavers (1959)
- The Weavers at Carnegie Hall Vol. 2 (1960)
- The Weavers' Almanac (1962)
- Weavers Gold Folk Songs By the Weavers (1962)
- Reunion at Carnegie Hall (1963)
- Reunion at Carnegie Hall, Part 2 (1965)
- Songs That Never Fade (1976)
- Together Again (1981)
- Kisses Sweeter Than Wine (1994)
- Kisses Sweeter Than Wine Vol 1 (1995)

== See also ==
- American folk music revival
- The Kingston Trio
- Red Scare
- "Waist Deep in the Big Muddy", the song that ended Pete Seeger's blacklisting in 1968
