= Fred Hellerman =

American folk singer-songwriter (1927–2016)

- Born: May 13, 1927; Brooklyn, New York, U.S.
- Died: September 1, 2016 (aged 89) Weston, Connecticut, U.S.
- Genres: American folk music
- Occupations: Musician, record producer, singer-songwriter
- Labels: Folkways Records, Cameo Records, Riverside Records

Fred Hellerman (May 13, 1927 – September 1, 2016) was an American folk singer, guitarist, producer, and songwriter. Hellerman was an original member of the seminal American folk group The Weavers, together with Pete Seeger, Lee Hays, and Ronnie Gilbert. He produced the record album Alice's Restaurant (1967) for Arlo Guthrie, played accompaniment guitar on scores of folk albums, and wrote a number of folk and protest songs.

== Life and career ==
Born on May 13, 1927, in Brooklyn, New York to Jewish parents, Hellerman was the youngest of three children. His father, Harry, was an immigrant from Riga, Latvia and mother, Clara (née Robinson), was born in the United States to immigrants from Riga. He received a Bachelor of Arts degree in 1949 at Brooklyn College. In 1948, Hellerman formed the Weavers with Seeger, Ronnie Gilbert, and Lee Hays. Hellerman wrote and co-wrote some of their hits. He also wrote under the aliases Fred Brooks and Bob Hill. Because of his involvement with left-wing groups during the 1930s and 1940s, Hellerman came under suspicion of Communist sympathies during the McCarthy era.

In 1950, Hellerman was named, along with the rest of the Weavers, in the anti-communist tract Red Channels and was placed on the industry blacklist. In February 1952, an FBI informant testified that the Weavers were members of the Communist party. The group, unable to perform on television, radio, or in most music halls, broke up in 1952, but resumed singing in 1955. They continued together until 1963 (with changes in personnel). He also played on Joan Baez's eponymous first album in 1960. The Weavers held several reunion concerts in 1980, shortly before Hays' death, which were documented in the film The Weavers: Wasn't That a Time! (1982).

Hellerman, using the pseudonym Fred Brooks, adapted "Green Grow the Lilacs" for Harry Belafonte's 1959 album, Love is a Gentle Thing. The song, rooted in a traditional Irish tune popular in the 19th century United States, received new lyrics with two original verses penned by Hellerman, who also reworked the chorus.

Hellerman married the writer Susan Lardner, the daughter of John Lardner, in 1970. The Hellermans had two children, Caleb and Simeon, and three grandchildren.

Hellerman was the last surviving original member of the Weavers. He died on September 1, 2016, at his home in Weston, Connecticut, at the age of 89.

== Discography ==
- G.I. American Army Songs (with Oscar Brand) (Riverside, 1957)
- Yiddish Love Songs (with Ruth Rubin) (Riverside, 1958)
- Sunny's Gallery Of Folk Ballads (with Sunny Schwartz and Eric Weissberg) (Cameo, 1963)
- Sing Out! Hootenanny (with Leon Bibb, Betty Sanders, Pete Seeger, and others) (Folkways, 1963)

== See also ==
- Fran Minkoff
