= Knockout (disambiguation) =

A knockout, in several sports, is a strike that renders an opponent unable to continue fighting.

Knockout may also refer to:

== Sports and games ==
- Knock Out (Gottlieb pinball), a 1950 pinball machine
- Knock Out (kickboxing), a Japanese kickboxing promotion
- Knock Out (tabletop game), a tabletop game by the Milton Bradley Company
- Knockout (game), a basketball-related activity
- Knockout Cup (speedway), a British motorcycle speedway competition
- Knockout system, a tournament format divided into successive rounds
- Knockout tournament, a single-elimination tournament
- New England Knockouts, an American professional baseball team in Massachusetts
- Technical knockout (TKO), a knockout called by an official for safety reasons
- "TNA Knockout", a term used by Total Nonstop Action Wrestling to refer to its female talent
- Knockout Tour, a playable mode in the 2025 kart racing game Mario Kart World

== Comics ==
- Knockout (1971 comic), either of two British comic books
- Knockout (DC Comics), a comic book character
- Knock Out (Transformers: Prime), a fictional robot supervillain turned superhero
- Knockout, a Femme Fatales comics character

== Literature ==
- Knock-Out (novel), a Bulldog Drummond novel
- Knockout: Interviews with Doctors Who Are Curing Cancer – And How to Prevent Getting It in the First Place, a book by Suzanne Somers

== Music ==
- Knockout Entertainment, an American record label
- Knock Out (Bonfire album) (1991), album by the hard rock band Bonfire
- "Knockout" (Triple 8 song) (2003), a song by the British pop/rock group Triple 8
  - "Twins (Knock Out)", a cover version by Super Junior
- "Knockout" (Lil Wayne song) (2010), song by Lil Wayne from his album Rebirth
- "K.O." (Pabllo Vittar song) (2017), song by Pabllo Vittar from her album Vai Passar Mal
- TKO (The Knock Out), 2018 album by Mya
- Knock Out!, a 1981 album by Toots and the Maytals
- "Knockout" (Bon Jovi song), song from 2016 album This House Is Not for Sale
- "Knock Out" (GD & TOP song), 2011 song by GD & TOP for their self-entitled album
- "Knockout" (2019), a song by Martin Tungevaag

== Film, television, and stage ==
- The Knockout, a 1914 Keystone Studios film with Fatty Arbuckle and Charlie Chaplin.
- The Knockout (1923 film), a 1923 British silent sports film directed by Alexander Butler
- The Knockout (1925 film), a silent drama directed by Lambert Hillyer
- Knockout (1935 film), a German sports film
- Knockout (1941 film), a 1941 American drama directed by William Clemens
- Knock Out (1943 film), a 1943 Italian crime film directed by Carmine Gallone
- Knockout (1979), one of three Broadway plays starring Danny Aiello, all written by Louis La Russo II
- Knockout (1992 film), an Indian Tamil-language short film
- Knockout (2000 film), an American film about a female boxer
- Knock Out (2010 film), an Indian Hindi-language action-thriller film
- Knockout (2011 film) or Born to Fight, a Canadian film
- Haywire (2011 film) or Knockout, a 2011 American film
- Knockout (game show), a 1977–78 NBC series hosted by Arte Johnson
- Knockout (Indonesian TV series), a game show
- The Knockout (Chinese TV series), a 2023 Chinese TV series directed by Xu Jizhou

== Information technology ==
- Knockout (web framework), a JavaScript library
- Image knockout, removing the background from an image

== Material removal ==
- Knock-outs, partially punched enclosure openings for optional removal
- Knockout punch, a metalworking tool
- Knock-out pot, a vapor–liquid separator

== Other uses ==
- Knockouts (salon), an American salon chain
- Knockout CP Freshmart (born 1990), Thai boxer and former Muay Thai fighter
- Knock-out option, a barrier option in financial markets
- Knockout game, a criminally violent activity
- Gene knockout, molecular biology technique
- Operation Knockout, a military campaign
- Reversing type, also known as knocking out, a method of typographic printing
- Touchless knockout, fraudulent practice and claims of knocking out an opponent without making physical contact

== See also ==
- Incapacitation (disambiguation)
  - Knockout gas
  - Knockout drops
- Knocking one out, a euphemism
- KO (disambiguation)
- Knock Yourself Out (disambiguation)
- Double knockout (disambiguation)
- Knockout game (disambiguation)
