= Ability (disambiguation) =

An ability is the power an agent has to perform various actions.

Ability may also refer to:

== Characteristics of agents ==
- Aptitude, a component of a competency to do a certain kind of work at a certain level
- Capability (disambiguation)
- Intelligence, the ability to perceive, infer, retain or apply information
- Knowledge, a familiarity with someone or something, which can include facts, information, descriptions, or skills
- Potential (disambiguation)
- Power (social and political), the ability to influence people or events
- Skill, the learned ability to carry out a task with pre-determined results

== Ships ==
- Ability (1878), Australian ketch
- Ability (1910), Australian steamer

== Other uses ==
- Ability score, in role-playing games
- Ability grouping
- Ability (magazine)
- Ability (Fringe), a 2009 episode of the television series Fringe
- Ability (manhwa), a 2012 Manhwa webtoon published in Naver Magazine
- "Abilities", a song by Nana Mizuki from Alive & Kicking, 2004

== See also ==
- Capability (disambiguation)
- Capacity (disambiguation)
- Incapacitation (disambiguation)
