= Capacity =

Capacity or capacities may refer to:

== Mathematics, science, and engineering ==
- Capacity of a container, closely related to the volume of the container
- Capacity of a set, in Euclidean space, the total charge a set can hold while maintaining a given potential energy
- Capacity factor, the ratio of the actual output of a power plant to its theoretical potential output
- Storage capacity (energy), the amount of energy that the storage system of a power plant can hold
- Nameplate capacity, the intended full-load sustained output of a facility such as a power plant
- Heat capacity, a measurement of changes in a system's internal energy
- Combining capacity, another term for valence in chemistry
- Battery capacity, the amount of electric charge a battery can deliver at the rated voltage

== Computer ==
- Data storage capacity, amount of stored information that a storage device or medium can hold
- Channel capacity, the highest rate at which information can be reliably transmitted

== Social ==
- Carrying capacity, the population size of a species that its environment can sustain
- Capacity planning, the process of determining the production resources needed to meet product demand
- Capacity building, strengthening the skills, competencies and abilities of developing societies
- Productive capacity, the maximum possible output of an economy
- Capacity management, a process used to manage information technology in business
- Capacity utilization, the extent to which an enterprise or a nation uses its theoretical productive capacity
- Road capacity, the maximum traffic flow rate that theoretically may be attained on a given road
- Seating capacity, the number of people who can be seated in a specific space

== Legal ==
- Capacity (law), the capability and authority to undertake a legal action

== Arts ==
- Capacities (album), an album by Up Dharma Down
- Capacity (album), an album by Big Thief

== See also ==
- Capacitance, in physics
- Ability (disambiguation)
- Capability (disambiguation)
- Incapacitation (disambiguation)
