= TKO (disambiguation) =

A technical knockout (TKO) is a professional fighting term.

TKO may also refer to:

== Sports ==
- TKO, the names of two professional wrestling moves referring to either the cutter or stunner variant
- TKO Group Holdings, a combat sports company

== Music ==
=== Artists ===
- TKO (band), a rock band from Seattle, Washington
- TKO, a pop group led by Katie White

=== Albums ===
- TKO (Tsakani Mhinga album), 2000
- TKO (The Knock Out), 2018 album by Mýa
- TKO, album by Kelly Khumalo, 2005

=== Songs ===
- "TKO" (song), by Justin Timberlake, 2013
- "TKO", from Bassnectar's Unlimited, 2016
- "TKO", from Jesse Malin's The Fine Art of Self Destruction, 2002
- "TKO", a song by Le Tigre from the 2004 album This Island
- "TKO", a song by Motion City Soundtrack from the 2015 album Panic Stations
- "TKO", from the Sam & Max Season Two Soundtrack
- "T.K.O.", by Giant Panda, 2005
- "T.K.O.", from Womack & Womack's debut album Love Wars, 1983
- "T.K.O. (Boxing Day)", from Elvis Costello's Punch the Clock, 1983
- "T.K.O.", from Dave Grusin's Migration, 1989
- "TKO", from Ive's Ive Empathy, 2025
- "TKO (Knock You Out)" a 2003 song by Bubbles

== Film and TV ==
- "TKO" (Babylon 5), a 1994 television episode
- T.K.O. (film), a 2007 film starring Dianna Agron
- The Kill Order, the prequel novel to The Maze Runner series
- Three Kingdoms Online, a browser based strategy game
- TKO: Total Knock Out, an obstacle course reality TV game show
- T.K.O., an OK K.O.! Let's Be Heroes character
- TKO, an unsold game show hosted by Peter Tomarken

== Technology ==
- Taylor KO Factor, a measurement of the stopping power of a firearms cartridge
- TKO Software, a defunct software company
- Triple knockout, in molecular biology
- "To keep open", a medical acronym for an intravenous drip that is flowing just enough to keep the IV open for future use (sometimes written as KVO—"keep vein open")

== Other uses ==
- The Kindness Offensive, a North London group known for random acts of kindness
- Tie knock out, a railroad maintenance vehicle also known as a tie extractor
- Tseung Kwan O, a new town in Hong Kong
  - MTR station code for Tseung Kwan O station
- Station code for Taman Kota railway station in West Jakarta, Indonesia
- TKO Studios, a comics publisher

== See also ==
- KO (disambiguation)
- Knockout (disambiguation)
