= Ko =

KO is a knockout in various sports, such as boxing and martial arts.

K.O., Ko or Kō may also refer to:

== Arts and entertainment ==
=== Music ===
- K.O. (album), 2021, by Danna Paola
- Ko (soundtrack), for the 2011 Indian film (see below) by Harris Jayaraj
- "K.O." (song), by Pabllo Vittar
- "KO" (song), 2025, by NLE Choppa
- K.O., a 2008 album by Rize
- "K.O.", a 2004 song by Smujji

=== Other media ===
- Ko (Go), in the board game Go
- Ko (film), a 2011 Indian Tamil-language action film by K. V. Anand
- Knight Online, a 2004 online role-playing game
- K.O., protagonist in OK K.O.! Let's Be Heroes
- Ko Ukumori, a character in the air combat game The Sky Crawlers: Innocent Aces
- Knowledge Organization, an academic journal published by the International Society for Knowledge Organization

== Business and organizations ==
- Alaska Central Express (IATA airline designator KO)
- Civic Coalition (Poland), or Koalicja Obywatelska (KO), a Polish electoral alliance
  - or Civic Coalition (party), a Polish political party of the same name
- The Coca-Cola Company (stock ticker symbol KO and corporate internet domain ko.com)
- Kelly Oils Ltd, a fuels merchant in Northern Ireland
- Momofuku Ko, a New York restaurant

== Language ==
- Ko language
- Ko (kana), the romanization of the Japanese kana こ and コ
- Korean language (ISO 639-1 code KO)

== People ==
=== Musicians ===
- KO (musician), Canadian musician who plays a fusion of hip hop and folk music
- K.O (rapper), South African rapper Ntokozo Mdluli
- Karen O (born 1978), lead singer of the rock group Yeah Yeah Yeahs
- Karen Olivo, an American actor, theater educator, and singer
- Kevin Olusola, American cellist, beatboxer and member of a cappella group Pentatonix

=== Other people ===
- Kō Nakata (born 1960), Japanese Islamic scholar
- Ko Simpson (born 1983), professional American football player for the Buffalo Bills
- Kevin Owens, Canadian professional wrestler
- Yi Ko (died 1171), Korean military ruler
- Karen Olivo, an American actor, theater educator, and singer

== Places ==
- Ko Mountain, the second-highest peak in the Sikhote-Alin Mountains of Russia
- Ko. Madhepura, Nepal, a village development committee
- Ko, Lamphun, Thailand, a village and subdistrict
- Kö, an urban boulevard in Düsseldorf, Germany
- Kosovo, sometimes represented by country code KO (but usually XK)
- Keio University, a university in Tokyo, Japan

== Science and technology ==
=== Mathematics, computing, and information science ===
- Knowledge organization, branch of information science
- Knowledge Organization, an academic journal published by the International Society for Knowledge Organization
- Kilooctet (computing), a unit of information or computer storage
- Loadable kernel module (file extension .ko)
- Real K-theory

=== Other technologies ===
- Ko, an ancient Chinese weapon also known as a dagger-axe in English
- Kō, a version of the foot plough used by the Māori people
- Gene knockout, a molecular biology genetic technique, abbreviated KO

== Religion ==
- Kemetic Orthodoxy
- Dukkha, the concept of unsatisfactoriness in Buddhism

== Surnames ==
- Ko (Korean surname)
- Gao (surname), a surname of Chinese origin romanized to Ko in Hong Kong, and in several romanizations especially in South-east Asia
- Ke (surname), a Chinese surname romanized as "Ko" in the Wade–Giles system
- Xu (surname 許), a surname of Chinese romanized as Ko in the Teochew

== Transportation ==
- Kō Station (Aichi) on the Meitetsu Nagoya Main Line in Japan
- Kō Station (Tokushima) on the Tokushima Line in Japan
- Alaska Central Express, IATA airline designator
- Railway line prefix KO of Keio lines

== Other uses ==
- Knock-off, a counterfeit product
- Knockout, in various sports
- Contracting Officer, US government acronym KO or CO
- Kick-off (association football), the time or manner of start of play
- Kō, Japanese for incense; see Japanese incense
  - Kōdō, the art of appreciating Japanese incense

== See also ==
- TKO (disambiguation)
- Kayo (disambiguation)
- Knockout (disambiguation)
- K0 (disambiguation)
- Kou (disambiguation)
- Gong (disambiguation), called Ko in Japanese
