= Kayo =

Kayo or KAYO may refer to:

== Media and entertainment ==
- KAYO (FM), radio station licensed to Wasilla, Alaska
- KYYO (FM), radio station branded as 96.9 KAYO and licensed to McCleary, WA
- Kayo (music), a Korean term for pop music, also known as K-pop
- Kayo Sports, an Australian sports streaming service

== People ==
- Kayo, member of the Japanese new wave band Polysics, whose name is taken from the Korean term for pop music
- Kayo Dottley, American football player
- Kayo Hatta, American film director
- Kayo Shekoni, Swedish singer, dancer, and actress
- Kayo Henmi (逸見 佳代; born 1979), Japanese freestyle skier
- Kayo Hoshino (星野 賀代; born 1972), Japanese former volleyball
- Kayo Inaba (稲葉 カヨ; born 1950), Japanese Professor at Kyoto University
- Kayo Kitada (北田 佳世; born 1978), Japanese judoka
- Kayo Matsuo (松尾 嘉代; born 1943), Japanese actress
- Kayo Noro (野呂 佳代; born 1983), Japanese idol
- Kayo Satoh (佐藤 かよ; born 1988), Japanese model
- Senuma Kayō (瀬沼 夏葉; 1875 – 1915), Japanese translator and teacher
- Kayo Sugaya (菅谷 佳代; born 1955), Japanese international table tennis player
- Kayo Sugihara (杉原 加代; born 1983), Japanese athlete
- Kayo Yamaguchi (山口 華楊; 1899 – 1984), Japanese painter
- Kayō Yasutoki (嘉陽 快宗; born 1999), Japanese sumo wrestler
- Aiko Kayō (嘉陽 愛子; born 1985), Japanese singer, and actress

== Fictional characters ==
- Kayo Mullins, the title character's little brother in the comic strip Moon Mullins
- Kayo, a fictional character in the He-Man universe
- Kayo the Hutt, a Star Wars character
- Tin-Tin Kyrano, Thunderbirds character also known as "Kayo" in the 2015 series.
- Kayo Hinazuki, a main character in the manga and anime Boku Dake ga Inai Machi
- Policeman in Lone Wolf McQuade
- Kayo, an accident-prone chameleon in Tabaluga
- Kayo, the alias of Hanayo Koizumi from Love Live! School Idol Project
- Kayo Sudou, a character portrayed by Megurine Luka from The Evillious Chronicles

== Other uses ==
- Kayo or fry sauce, popular slang for the condiment created by mixing tomato ketchup and mayonnaise
- KAYO (Albania), an Albanian state-owned arms production and trade company
- Kayo Chocolate Drink, bottled chocolate soft drink named for Kayo Mullins

== See also ==
- KO (disambiguation)
- Kaio (disambiguation)
- Kajo (disambiguation)
- Kayo Dot, a metal band
