= Knockout game (disambiguation) =

"Knockout game" is a term used in the United States to describe a purportedly related series of street assaults.

Knockout game may also refer to:

- Knock Out (tabletop game), a tabletop game by the Milton Bradley Company
- Knockout, a variation of basketball
- Knock-out whist, an every player for themselves variant of Whist
- One-game playoff (also knockout), a tiebreaker in certain sports

== See also ==
- Knockout (disambiguation)
