= Nordco =

Railroad manufacturing company in Wisconsin

Nordco, Inc.
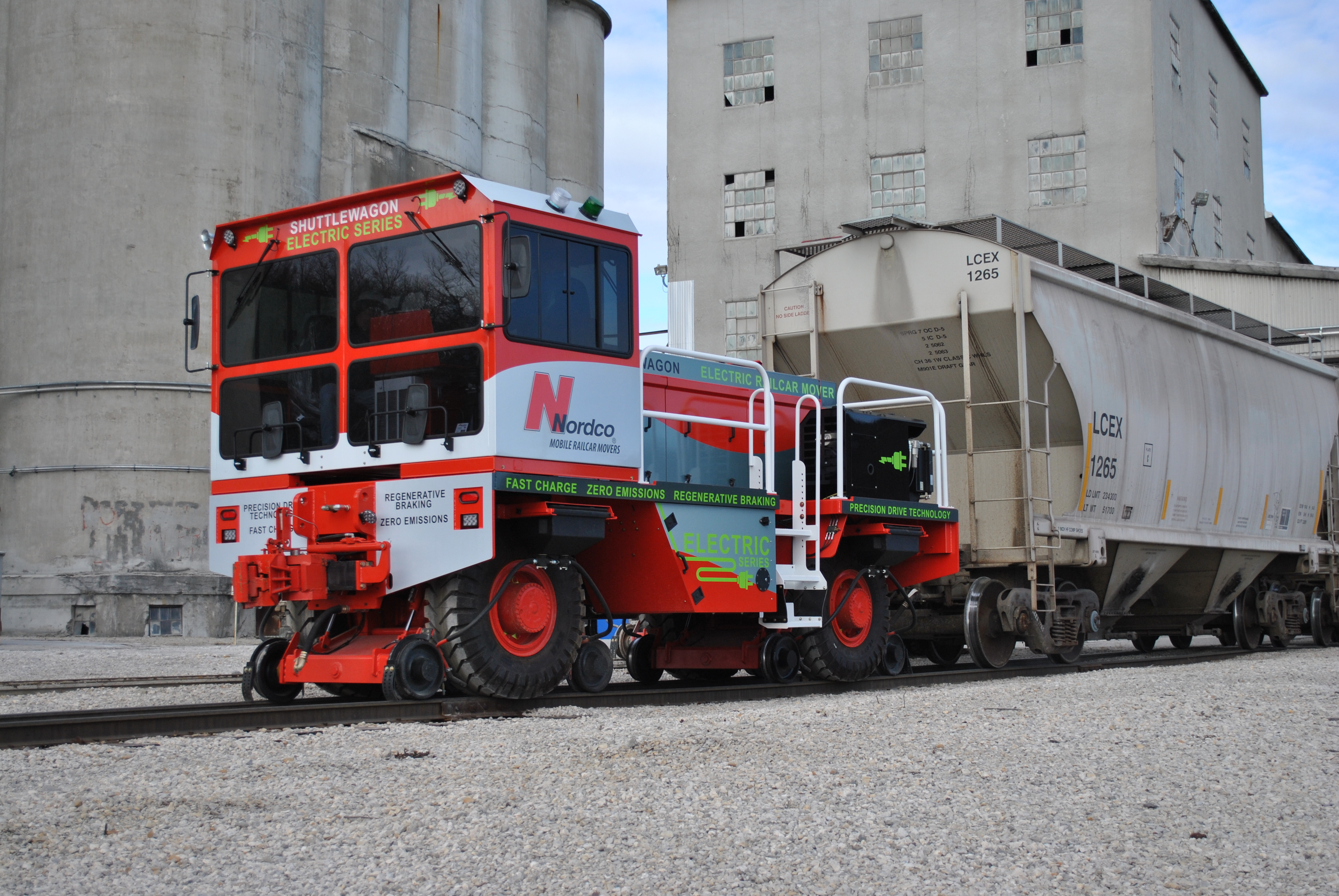
- A Nordco railcar mover, part of the company's Shuttlewagon line
- Industry: Railroad maintenance equipment
- Founded: 1926
- Founder: Nordberg Manufacturing Company
- Headquarters: Oak Creek, Wisconsin
- Area served: North America
- Revenue: $175 million (2021)
- Operating income: $40 million (2021)
- Parent: Wabtec
- Website: nordco.com

Nordco, Inc. is an American manufacturer of railroad maintenance of way and inspection equipment, based in Oak Creek, Wisconsin. Founded in 1926, it has been a subsidiary of Wabtec since 2021. The company is one of the top manufacturers of railroad maintenance equipment in North America.

== History ==
Nordco was founded in 1926 as a division of Nordberg Manufacturing Company. Nordco was purchased by OMERS Private Equity in 2009. In 2021, Nordco was acquired by Wabtec in a $400 million deal.

=== Acquisitions ===
Nordco purchased Illinois railroad maintenance machinery rebuilder J.E.R. Overhaul in 2006, followed by Connecticut based non-destructive testing company Dapco Industries in 2007. Both of the headquarters of these companies now serve as additional manufacturing facilities for Nordco. These were followed in 2008 by the purchase of Central Power Products, manufacturer of the Shuttlewagon series of railcar movers.

In 2016, Nordco acquired Kansas heavy lift truck manufacturer Royal Tractor.

== Products ==
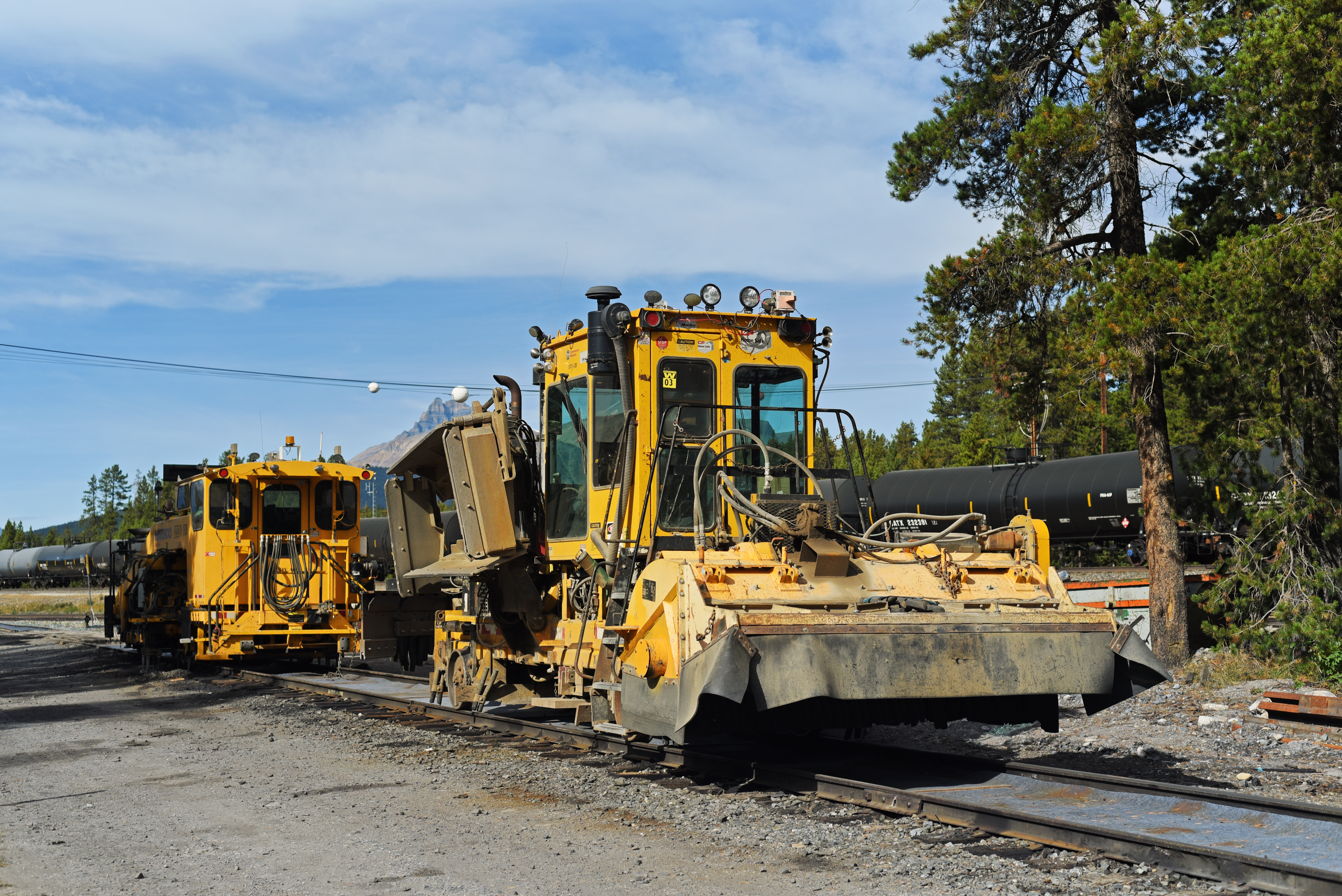
Ballast Regulator

Nordco manufactures and rebuilds a wide variety of maintenance of way vehicles, including tie exchangers, ballast regulators, spike drivers, spike pullers, and tie cranes. The company also manufactures equipment for non-destructive rail testing, used to inspect railroad tracks for defects. Products range from portable inspection systems to larger systems based on hirail vehicles. Through the company's Shuttlewagon division, Nordco also produces railcar movers and forklifts.

In 2012, Nordco constructed a $438,000 ballast regulator/snowplow for the Long Island Rail Road. Due to an error in construction, the plow was built too wide and touched the third rail, requiring Nordco correct the error at no additional cost.

== Subsidiaries ==
- Dapco Industries
- J.E.R. Overhaul
- Nordco Rail Services
- Shuttlewagon - Railcar mover manufacturer Shuttlewagon is based in Grandview, Missouri. Nordco purchased the company in 2008. In 2016, Shuttlewagon produced the world's first electric railcar mover, the NVX-E. Also in 2016, Shuttlewagon expanded its operations with a new nearly 500,000 square foot facility in Kansas City.
