= Senuma =

Senuma (written: 瀬沼) is a Japanese surname. Notable people with the surname include:

- Senuma Kayō, (瀬沼夏葉, 1897 – 1915), Japanese translator
- Yuji Senuma (瀬沼 優司; born 1990), Japanese footballer
