= Knock Yourself Out (disambiguation) =

"Knock Yourself Out" is a 2001 song by Jadakiss.

Knock Yourself Out may also refer to:

- "Knock Yourself Out", a 1987 episode of Full House
- "Knock Yourself Out", a song by Michelle Branch from the album Hopeless Romantic, 2017
- "Knock Yourself Out XD", a song by Porter Robinson from the album Smile! :D, 2024

== See also ==
- Knockout (disambiguation)
