= Kaio =

Kaio or KAIO may refer to:

== Fictional entities ==
- The Kaiō, gods of the fictional Dragon Ball universe
- The Kaiōshin, upper-level gods of the Dragon Ball universe
- Michiru Kaioh, a central character of the Sailor Moon meta-series
- Kaioh, a central antagonist in Fist of the North Star
- Kaio, a monster and star system in the 2009 RPG video game Spectrobes: Origins

== People ==
- Chōgorō Kaionji (1901–1977), Japanese author noted for historical fiction novels
- Kaiō Hiroyuki (born 1972), sumo wrestler
- Kaio de Almeida (born 1984), Brazilian swimmer
- Kaio Felipe Gonçalves (born 1987), Brazilian footballer
- Kaio Mendes (born 1995), Brazilian footballer
- Kaio Jorge (born 2002), Brazilian footballer

== Other uses ==
- KAIO (FM), a radio station (90.5 FM) licensed to serve Idaho Falls, Idaho, United States
- KWKK, a radio station (100.9 FM) licensed to serve Russellville, Arkansas, United States, which held the call sign KAIO-FM from 1984 to 1990
- Atlantic Municipal Airport (ICAO code KAIO)

== See also ==
- Kayo (disambiguation)
- Kajo (disambiguation)
