= Potential (disambiguation) =

Potential generally refers to a currently unrealized ability, in a wide variety of fields from physics to the social sciences.

== Mathematics and physics ==
- Scalar potential, a scalar field whose gradient is a given vector field
- Vector potential, a vector field whose curl is a given vector field
- Potential function (disambiguation)
- Potential variable (Boolean differential calculus)
- Potential energy, the energy possessed by an object because of its position relative to other objects, stresses within itself, its electric charge, or other factors
- Magnetic vector potential
- Magnetic scalar potential (ψ)
- Electric potential, the amount of work needed to move a unit positive charge from a reference point to a specific point inside the field without producing any acceleration
- Electromagnetic four-potential, a relativistic vector function from which the electromagnetic field can be derived
- Coulomb potential
- Van der Waals force, distance-dependent interactions between atoms or molecules
- Lennard-Jones potential, a mathematical model that approximates the interaction between a pair of neutral atoms or molecules.
- Yukawa potential, a potential in particle physics which may arise from the exchange of a massive scalar field
- Gravitational potential

== Biology ==
- Action potential, occurs when the membrane potential of a specific axon location rapidly rises and falls: this depolarisation then causes adjacent locations to similarly depolarise
- Membrane potential, the difference in electric potential between the interior and the exterior of a biological cell. With respect to the exterior of the cell, typical values of membrane potential range from –40 mV to –80 mV
- Water potential, the potential energy of water per unit volume relative to pure water in reference conditions

== Linguistics ==
- Potential mood

== Popular culture ==
- "Potential" (Buffy the Vampire Slayer), an episode of a television series
- Potential and new Slayers, characters in Buffy the Vampire Slayer
- "Potential" (song), a song by Danielle Bradbery on her album, I Don't Believe We've Met
- "Potential" (Sombr song), 2026
- Megumi Fushiguro, sometimes referred to as "Potential Man" by the fans of Jujutsu Kaisen

== Philosophy and society ==
- Potentiality and actuality, a "possibility" that a thing can be said to have
- Human Potential Movement, a social movement which asserts that all people have extraordinary untapped potential capacities

== See also ==
- Ability (disambiguation)
