= Kōbako =

Incense storage box used in kōdō

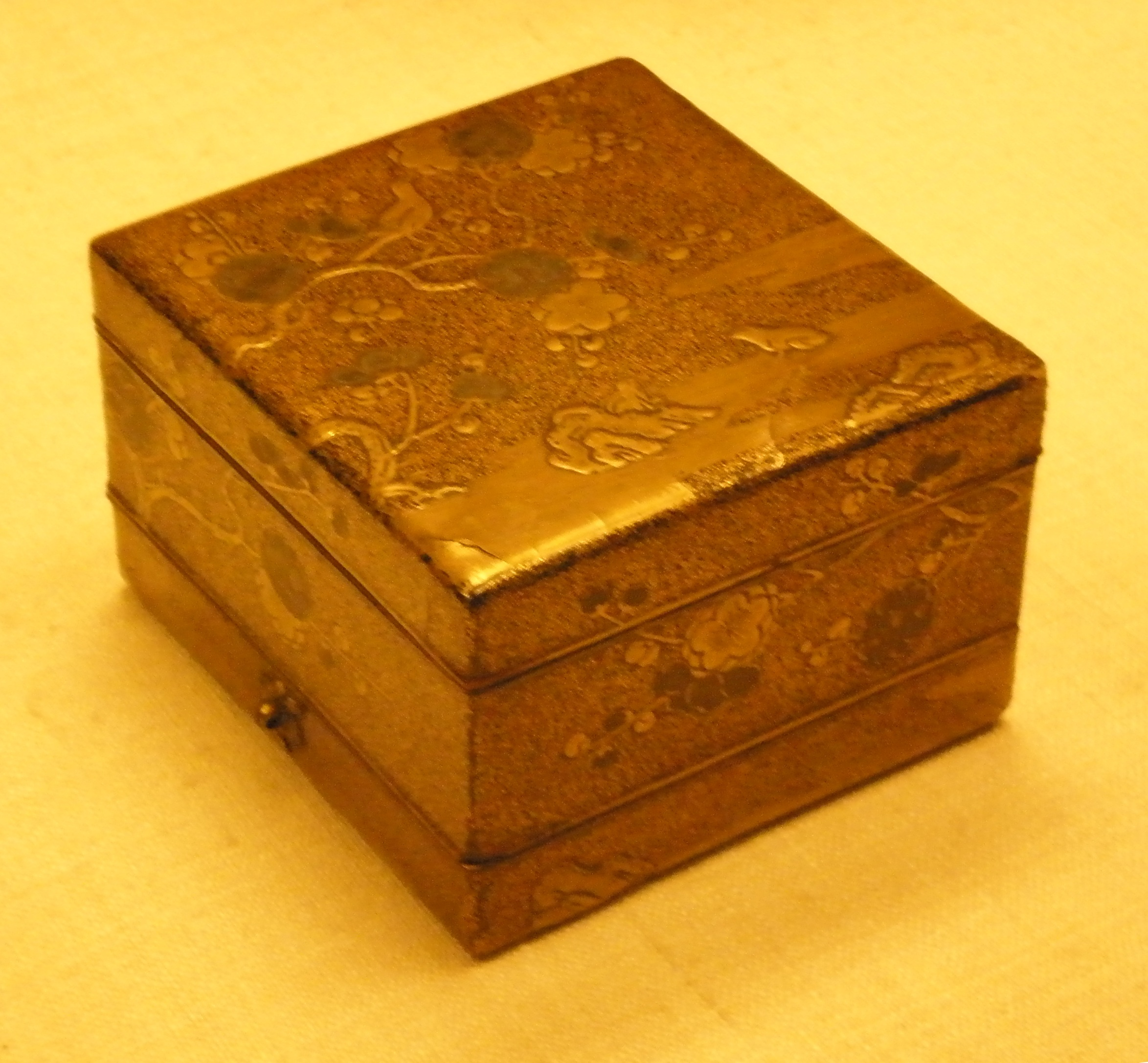
Incense container, wood covered in black lacquer with gold nashiji and takamaki-e lacquer, gilded copper fittings, a design of plum blossoms by a stream with frogs and a warbler (uguisu), probably about 1550-1600

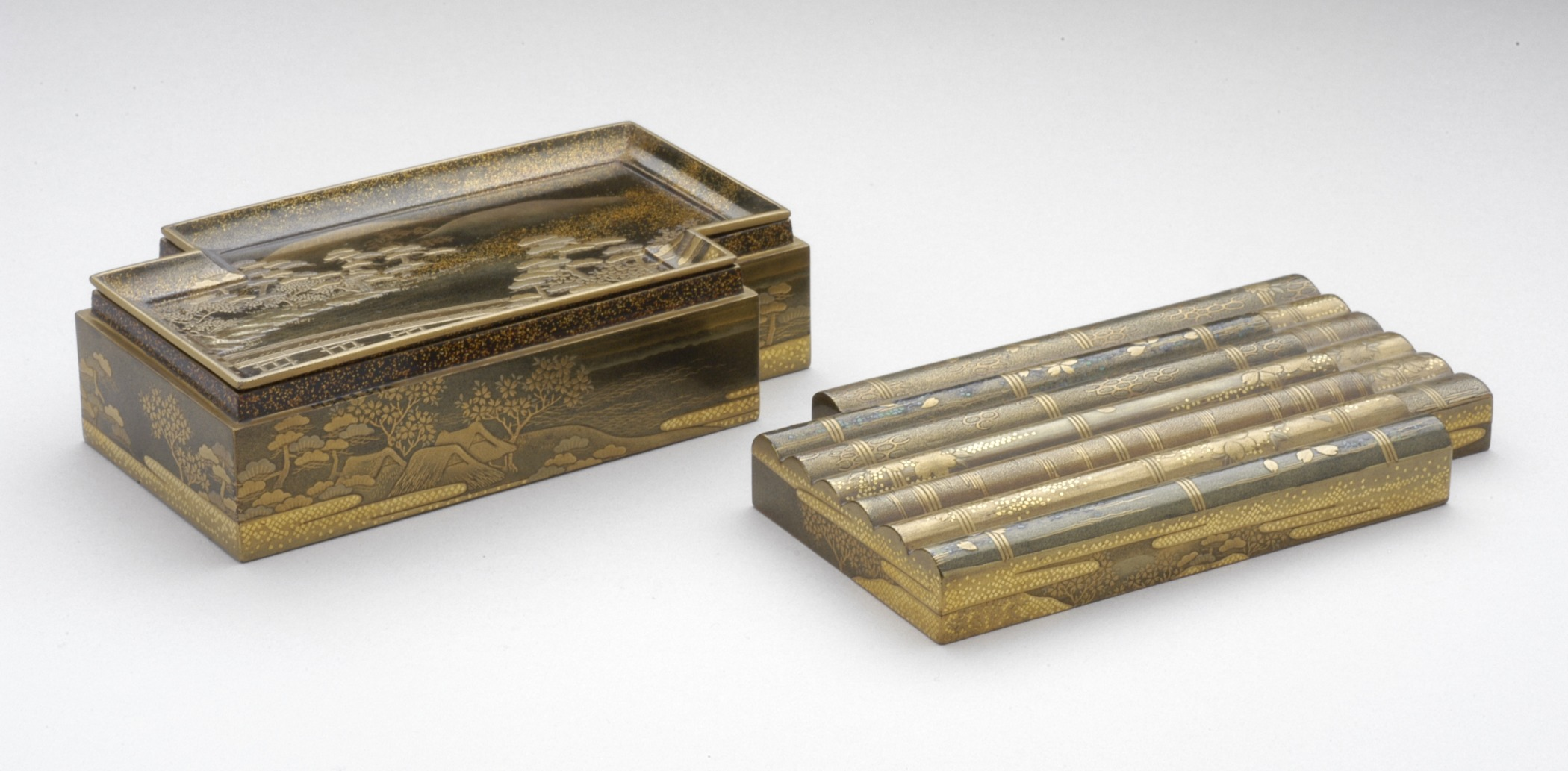
Incense box in the form of a raft with flowers, mid-19th century

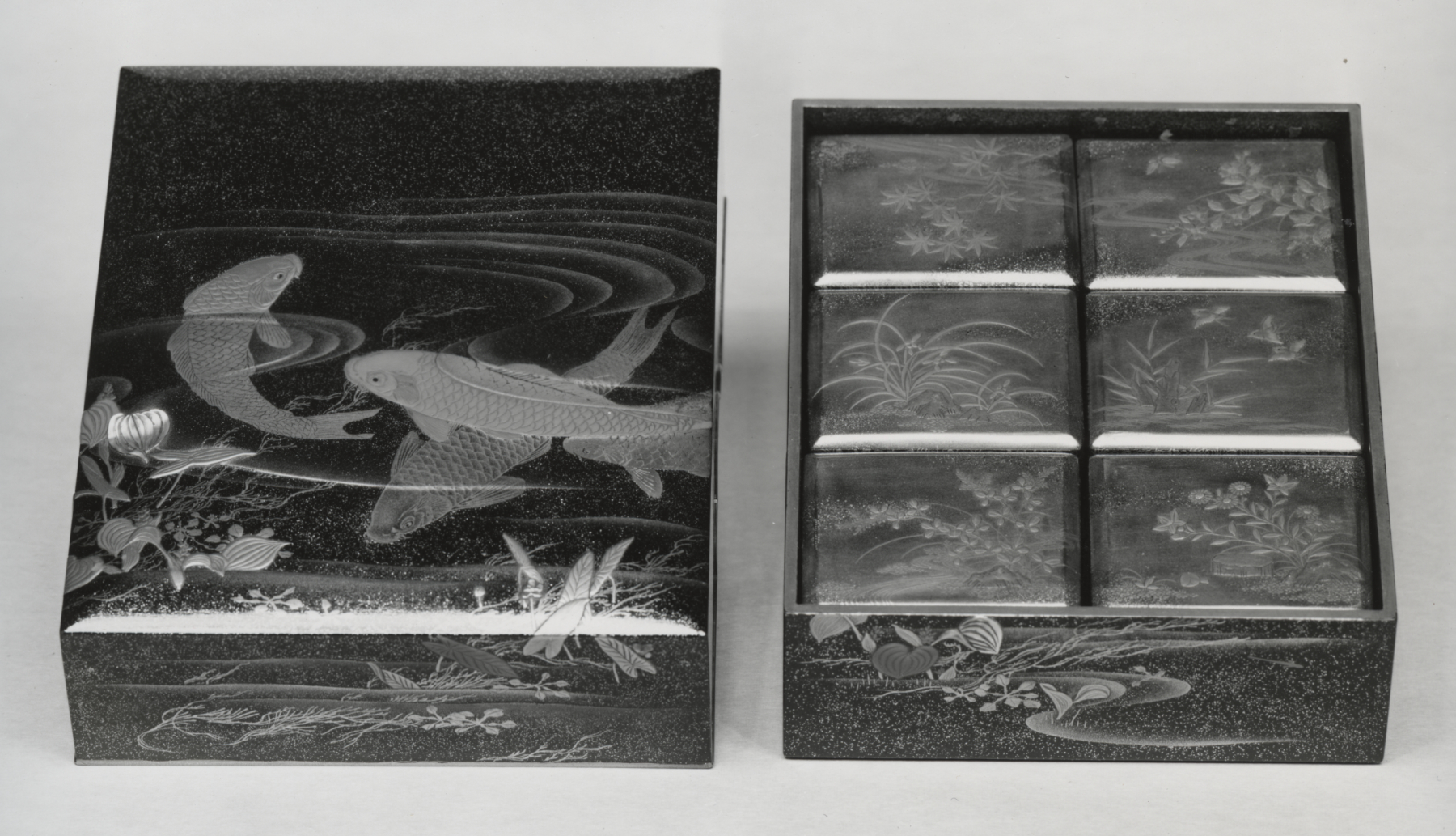
Set of boxes for storing incense wood, late 19th-early 20th century

A kōbako (香箱) is an incense storage box used in kōdō (香道, "Way of Incense"), the traditional Japanese art which involves using and appreciating incense within a structure of codified conduct. It can be used to store the items needed for the incense-comparing games. called kumikō (組香) and genjikō (源氏香). The similar word kobako (小箱; note the short o rather than long ō in the first syllable) means "small box" in Japanese.

The kōbako is somewhat similar to a kōgō, an incense box used in the Japanese tea ceremony. However, "the kōbako was usually a little larger than the kōgō, and sometimes had a small tray or small boxes to go with it."

Often decorated with lacquer and showing a high degree of craftmanship, kōbako are studied and collected by those who appreciate Japanese arts and crafts.

== Related meanings ==
The rugged Sōunkyō Gorge in Japan's Daisetsuzan National Park has an area of "fantastic crags". "The narrowest section of the gorge is called Kobako, or "Small Box", because of the enclosed feeling imparted by the towering rock pillars shooting up from the riverbanks."

In 1936, Bourjois introduced a perfume called Kobako, which was packaged in a container "inspired by an old lacquered cabinet". The perfume, described as a "Chypre Floral fragrance", is still on the market.

According to Kunihiko Kasahara, there is a traditional origami pattern called a Tsuno Kobako, which is identified as a "folded pouch for perfume". This paper folding pattern goes back at least to 1734, when it appeared in a book called Ranma Zushiki.

Kōbako is a slang term for "vagina" in Japanese. It is among several such slang terms for the vagina that "have flourished since the Edo period, and have been sharpened by centuries of persistent use".
