= Kajo =

Kajo may refer to:

== People ==
- Markus Kajo, Finnish reporter, screenwriter and TV show host
- Ali Kajo, Kenyan footballer
- Kajo Baldisimo, Filipino comic book artist

== Other uses ==
- Kajō, a Japanese era (1106–1108)
- Kashō, or Kajo, a Japanese era (848–851)
- KAJO, an American radio station
- Kajo, the 2023 FinnJamboree
- Corona Municipal Airport, ICAO code: KAJO, an airport in the United States

== See also ==
- Kayo (disambiguation)
- Kaio (disambiguation)
