= Shoyeido =

Shoyeido (Japanese: 松榮堂、松栄堂, Hepburn: Shōeidō), established in 1705 by Hata Rokuberi (a.k.a. Moriyoshi Rokuzaemon Hata and Rokubei Moritsune Hata), an employee of Kyoto's Imperial Palace and an incense hobbyist, is one of the oldest incense companies in Japan. The company is based in Kyoto, with shops in five cities in Japan, and one in America.

Shoyeido is credited for bringing incense to the Western world at the end of the 19th century.

== History ==
The first Shoyeido shop at the corner of Nijo and Karasuma streets was set up in 1705 by members of the Hata family, who were previously employees of the Imperial royal court. Exports to the West started in 1894.

Its first US office was set up in Boulder in 1990.

== Name ==
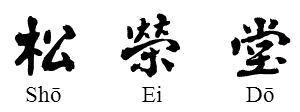
Shōeidō written in kanji

The name "Shoyeido" (Shōeidō) is derived from the three characters Shō, Ei, and Dō.

- Shō means "Pine tree"
- Ei is the ancient sound meaning "Prosperity"
- Dō is a store or company.

The Shō is from the traditional Sho Chiku Bai trio of shō (松 pine tree), chiku (竹 bamboo) and bai (梅 plum tree), which are used as a traditional Japanese grading system, to represent varying degrees of quality. In this grading system, shō represents the highest grade or quality.

== Activities ==
Shoyeido had 140 employees and made $30 million in sales in 1999. It manufactures most of its products in a facility in Nagaoka-kyō. It also owns an artisanal shop near Karasuma where it preserves the craftsmanship of incense-making and fills custom orders.

Shoyeido still uses its +300 year old secret recipe for religious orders.

Shoyeido is still a family business, today run by the twelfth generation of the Hata family.

Shoyeido has several stores in Japan across five cities, including four in Kyōto, three in Tōkyō, one in Sapporo, and one in Boulder, Colorado, USA. Shoyeido also manages the store LISN in Kyōto since 2004, which is specifically designed for the customers unfamiliar with the world of incense.

== Incense ==
Shoyeido carries several series of incense. The two main series are the "Daily Incense" series (京線香, Kyō-senkō) and the "Premium Incense" series (高級線香, Kōkyū-senkō). The following tables are ordered from least expensive to most expensive.

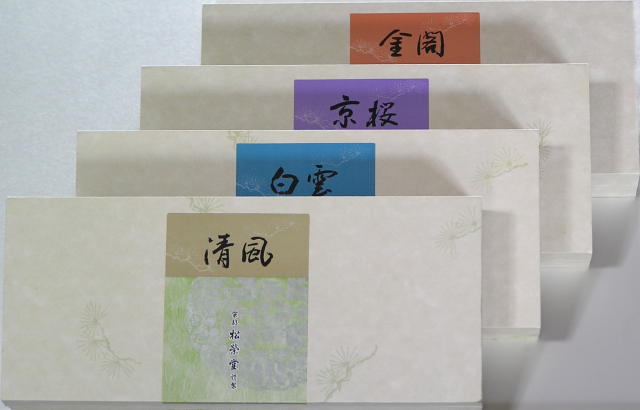
Half-size boxes: Sei-fū, Haku-un, Kyō-zakura, Kin-kaku

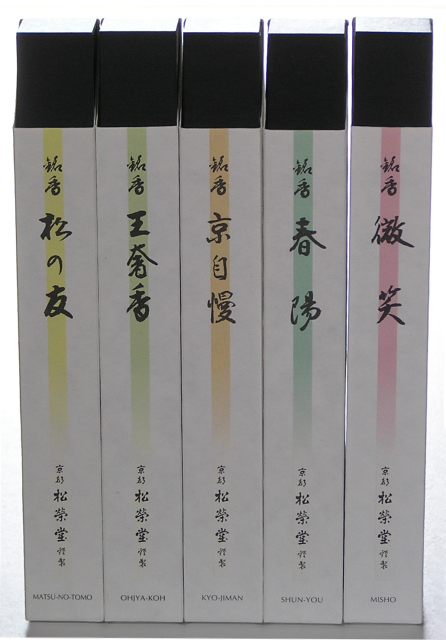
Premium incense: Matsu-no-tomo, Ōja-kō, Kyō-jiman, Shun-yō, Mishō

Daily Incense (京線香, Kyō-senkō)
English	Japanese	Romaji
Great Origin	大元香	Daigen-kō
Eternal Treasure	寶永香	Hōei-kō
Orchid	蘭華	Ranka
Kyoto Autumn Leaves	京にしき	Kyō-nishiki
Moss Garden	のきば	Nokiba
Golden Pavilion	金閣	Kin-kaku
Kyoto Cherry Blossom	京桜	Kyō-zakura
Five Hills	五山	Go-zan
White Cloud	白雲	Haku-un
Circle	円明	En-mei
Fresh Breeze	清風	Sei-fū
Low smoke series
Silhouette	ほのか	Honoka
Gossamer	かすみ	Kasumi
Illusions	おぼろ	Oboro

Premium Incense (高級線香, Kōkyū-senkō)
English	Japanese	Romaji
Friend of Pine	松の友	Matsu-no-tomo
King's Aroma	王奢香	Ōja-kō
Pride of Kyoto	京自慢	Kyō-jiman
Beckoning Spring	春陽	Shun-yō
Gentle Smile	微笑	Mishō
Southern Wind	南薫	Nan-kun
Refinement	雅芳	Ga-hō
Five Clouds	五雲	Go-un
Infinity	妙芳	Myō-hō
Translucent Path	正覚	Shō-kaku

== See also ==
- Incense in Japan
