= Knock Out (Gottlieb pinball) =

1950 pinball machine

- Manufacturer: D. Gottlieb & Co.
- Release date: December, 1950
- Design: Harry Mabs
- Artwork: Roy Parker
- Production run: 3,000

Knock Out is a pinball machine designed by Harry Mabs and released by Gottlieb on March 19, 1950. The game was marketed with the slogan: "Uproarious Slam-Bang Animation in a Real Ring on the Playfield". It is not connected with Knockout by Bally, from 1974.

== Description ==
Knock Out is considered one of the best of the classic Gottlieb woodrail era. The machine has well made artwork and a mechanical animation of two boxers and a referee inside a boxing ring on the playfield. If a knockout is achieved, one of the boxers goes down and the referee counts him down.

== Gameplay ==
A knockout can be achieved by completing the 1 through 5 bumpers scores or hitting the 1-3 and 3-5 targets, as well as the left and right lanes and the rollover button, when lit. When each ball is plunged into play, the blocking gate between the flippers is activated and remains in place until each ball achieves 300k points. By rolling through the right or left lane twice, the big money shot is lighting the right and lift saucers for 500k. Once lit, the saucers remain lit until the end of the game. It is possible to win a replay by completing a certain number of knock outs (10 to 13), selectable by the operator.

== Design team ==
- Concept: Harry Mabs
- Game Design: Harry Mabs
- Mechanics: Harry Mabs
- Artwork: Roy Parker
- Animation: Harry Mabs

== Digital version ==
This is one of seven Gottlieb tables recreated and released in Microsoft Pinball Arcade in 1998.
