= Incapacitation =

Incapacitation may refer to:

- Incapacitation (penology), one of the functions of punishment
- Incapacity, a legal disqualification

== See also ==
- Incapable (disambiguation)
- Incapacitant
- Incapacitating agent
- Knockout (disambiguation)
