= Ability (1910) =

Steamer

History
- Owner: Allan Taylor & Co
- Completed: 1910
- Fate: Wrecked

General characteristics
- Type: Wood Steamer
- Tonnage: 140 GRT
- Length: 30.48 m (100.0 ft)
- Beam: 8.382 m (27.50 ft)
- Draught: 1.829 m (6 ft 0 in)
- Installed power: Compound 15nhp

Ability was a wooden coastal transport steamer of 140 tons, owned by Parsons, R & Plunkett. She was scuttled and abandoned off Newcastle, New South Wales on 3 June 1960 or off Sydney on 3 April 1965.

== Sources ==
- "Ability". Australian National Shipwreck Database. Archived from the original on 15 May 2012.
