= Nippon Kodo =

Manufacturer of incense

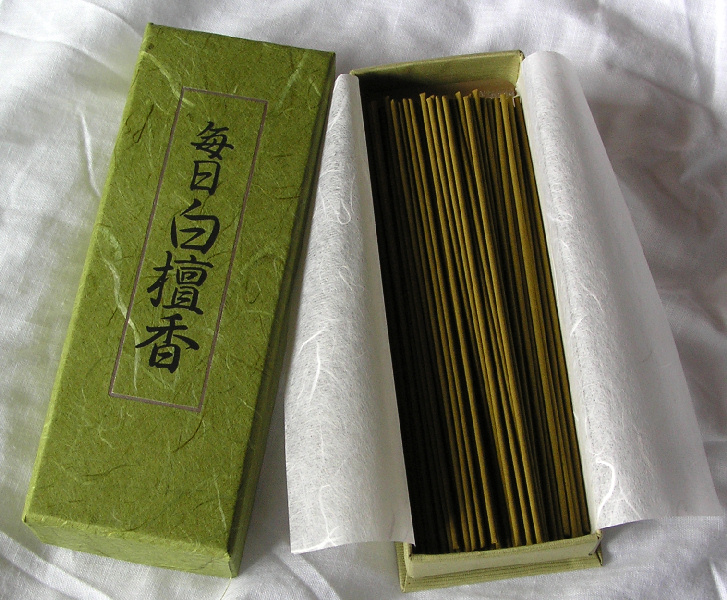
Nippon Kōdō: Mainichi Byakudan

Nippon Kodo (日本香堂) is a Japanese incense company that traces their origins back over 400 years to an incense maker known as Koju, who made incense for the Emperor of Japan. The Nippon Kodo Group was established in August 1965, has acquired several other incense companies worldwide, and has offices in New York City, Los Angeles, Paris, Chicago, Hong Kong, Vietnam, and Tokyo. Mainichi-Koh, introduced in 1912, is the company's most popular product.

== History ==
The company traces its roots back over 400 years to Jyuemon Takai, known as Koju, an incense maker to the Emperor of Japan. Founder Tadanori Konaka who was born in Izushi, Hyogo had gone to Osaka, and got a job in Kokando in 1920. He went to Tokyo in 1929. He had established Tokyo Kokando which is the basis of the current of Nippon Kodo, which sells products in the eastern Japan region of Kokando. The Nippon Kodo Group was established in August 1965, though it had been in business since 1575. It has acquired several other incense companies worldwide and has offices in Los Angeles, Paris, Chicago, Hong Kong, Vietnam, and Tokyo. The company's name means Japanese incense store.

== Brands ==
Nippon Kodo has several brands of incense, each consisting of several different fragrances. The most popular brand is "Morning Star", whose scents include Sandalwood, Cedar, and vanilla, and which is sold internationally. Other brands include Mainichi-Koh, which is Nippon Kodo's most popular product, introduced in 1912.

- Tokusen Mainichi-Koh, Nippon Kodo's deluxe version of Mainichi-Koh
- Seiun, Nippon Kodo's most popular smokeless product
- Jinkō Seiun, Nippon Kodo's most popular aloeswood incense
- Gozan-kōh, granulated incense used by many temples, often shipped in bulk
- Kataribe
- Hanaizumi
- Tendan
- Kafū
- Eiju
- Taiyō
- Seiten
- Kazedayori
- Shibayama
- Setsugekka/Hanamidō
- Dentōdō
- Cafe Time
- Esteban
- Scentsual
- Herb & Earth
- Fragrance Memories
- Kayuragi
- Scentscape
- Itten
- Naturense

There are four (4) incenses in Nippon Kodo's Traditional Series. These incenses contain ingredients from the Nippon Kodo collection.

- Everyday Sandalwood (Mainichi Byakudan)
- Fortune Mountain Agarwood (Jinkō Juzan)
- Diamond Kyara (Kyara Kongō)
- Great Prospects Kyara (Kyara Taikan)

== See also ==
- Japanese Incense Ceremony
