= Incense in Japan =

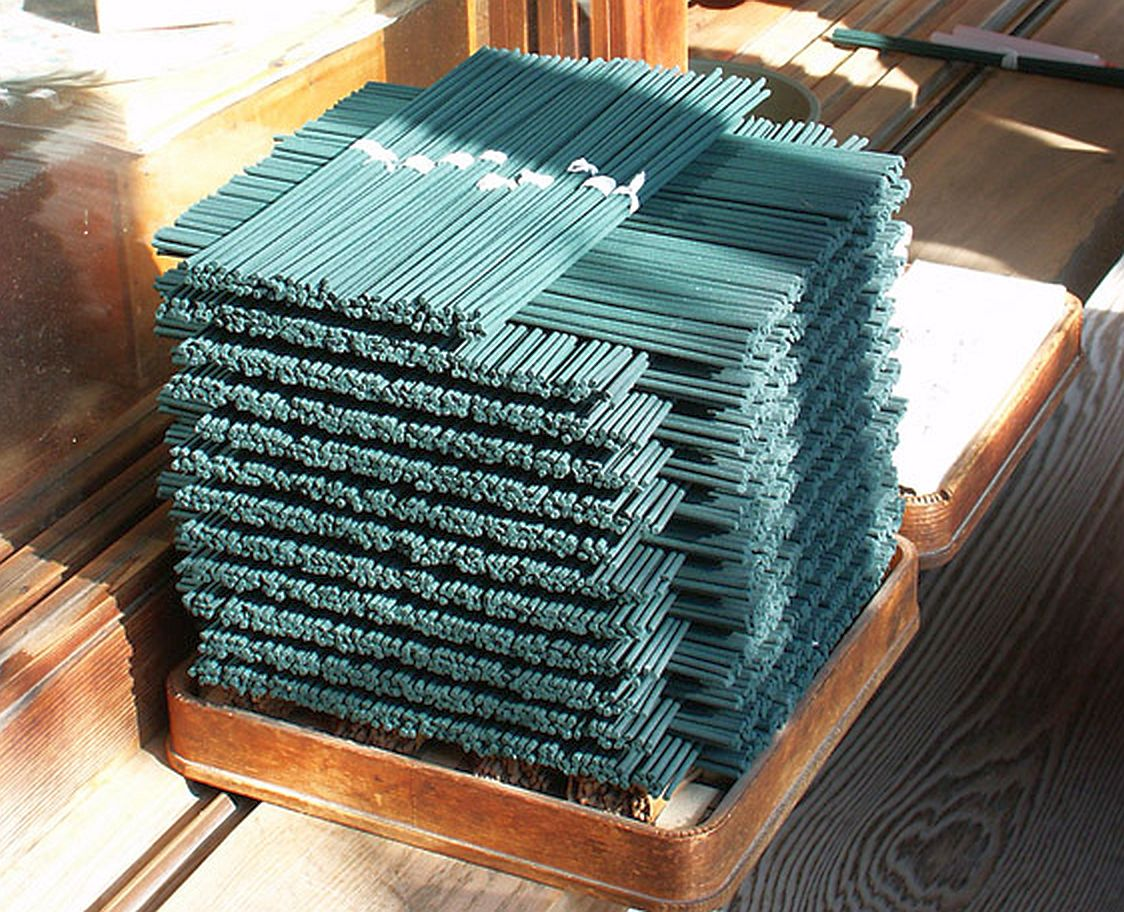
Stacks of incense at a temple in Japan

The burning of incense in Japan began during the 6th century (the Asuka period) with the introduction of Buddhism, which uses incense during rituals and ceremonies. Agarwood was imported into Japan from China via Korea. From that point on, incense would become an important facet of Japanese culture. Incense is used for a variety of purposes, including Buddhist ceremonies, spirituality and meditation.

There are two major types of incense in Japan, which are either heating or smouldering small pieces of fragrant wood, or direct-burning incense in form of sticks or cones formed out of paste without a bamboo stick.

Many of the current incense companies have been in existence for more than 300 years.

== Etymology ==
The word incense (kō) in Japan is written in the Chinese Kangxi radical 186 composed of nine strokes, 香, which can also be expanded up to 27 strokes 馫. A literal translation is "fragrance", though in context it is understood as "incense". The word 道 dō may be added, which means "way", both literally (street) and metaphorically (a stream of life experience), to give kōdō: the "way of incense", which involves using incense within a structure of codified conduct.

== History ==
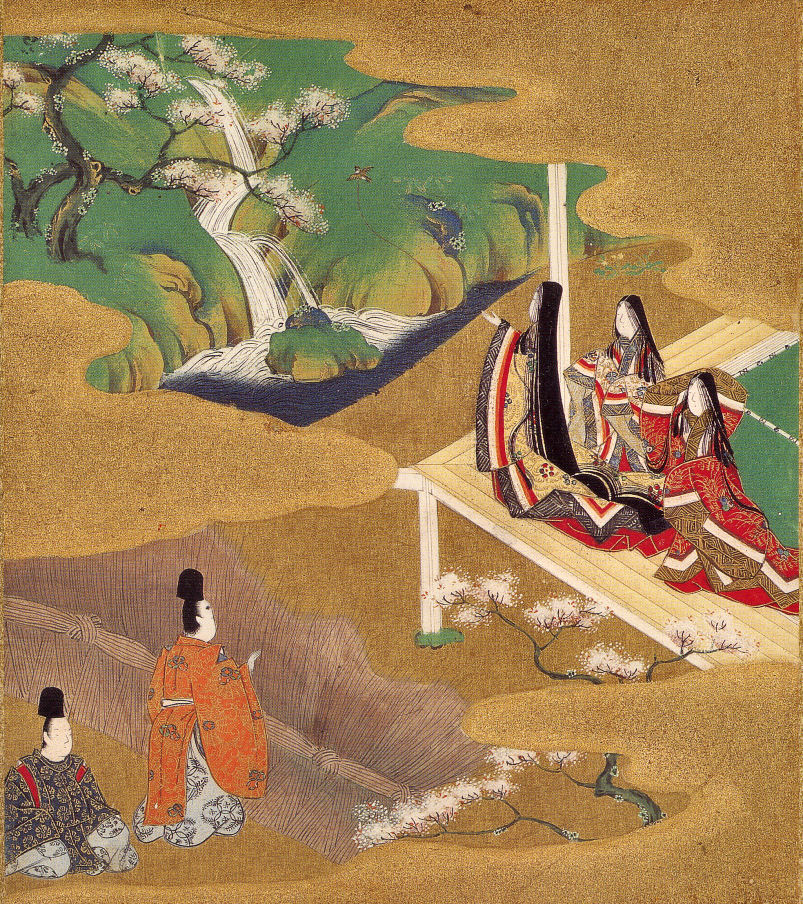
Fragrant scent played an important role at court during the Heian period (image from The Tale of Genji by Tosa Mitsuoki, 1617–91.)

Nihon Shoki, a book of classical Japanese history, gives the first formal record of incense in Japan when a log of agarwood, a fragrant wood used in incense burning, drifted ashore on Awaji Island during the Asuka period in 595 CE, and was presented to Prince Shōtoku and the Empress Suiko. Shōtoku knew of incense burning from Buddhism, which had been introduced into Japan around 538 CE; incense was part of Buddhist ritual, and was imported into Japan from China through Korea. Agarwood was imported in 538 CE during the building of a temple. A ritual known as sonaekō became established. Kōboku fragrant wood combined with herbs and other aromatic substances was burned to provide a fragrant incense for religious purposes. The custom of burning incense was further developed and blossomed amongst the court nobility with the pastime of takimono, a powdered mixture of aromatic substances. Fragrant scents played a vital role at court life during the Heian period, robes and even fans were perfumed and poems written about them, it also featured prominently in the epic The Tale of Genji in the 11th century.

Samurai warriors would prepare for battle by purifying their minds and bodies with the incense of kōboku; developing an appreciation for its fragrances. In the late Muromachi period in the 16th century, this aesthetic awareness would develop into the accomplishment known as kōdō, which is the art of enjoying the incense of smouldering kōboku. The present style of kōdō has largely retained the structure and manner of the Muromachi period, during which time the tea ceremony and the ikebana style of flower arrangement developed as well.

During the Tenshō era in the late 16th century, the master craftsman Kōjū was employed at the Kyoto Imperial Palace and practiced incense ceremony. The third Kōjū served under Toyotomi Hideyoshi, the fourth under Tokugawa Ieyasu. The eighth Kōjū Takae Jyuemon was known as a particular master of incense of note. During this time the “Ten Virtues of Kō” (香の十徳, kōnojūtoku) were formulated. These are a traditional listing of the benefits derived from the proper and correct use of quality incense:

1. 感格鬼神 : Sharpens the senses
2. 清浄心身 : Purifies the body and the spirit
3. 能払汚穢 : Eliminates pollutants
4. 能覚睡眠 : Awakens the spirit
5. 静中成友 : Heals loneliness
6. 塵裏愉閑 : Calms in turbulent times
7. 多而不厭 : Is not unpleasant, even in abundance
8. 募而知足 : Even in small amounts is sufficient
9. 久蔵不朽 : Does not break down after a very long time
10. 常用無障 : A common use is not harmful

Even today, there is a strong relationship and holistic approach in kōdō between fragrant scent, the senses, the human spirit, and nature. The spirituality and refined concentration that is central to kōdō (the Way of Incense) places it on the same level as kadō (the Way of Flowers) and chadō/sadō (the Way of Tea).

The start of the Edo period in the 19th century saw major changes in the history and production of incense. Senkō incense sticks became more widely available to the general public as production methods shifted to an industrial scale. At the start of the 20th century, mainichi-kō, or "everyday incense" was developed by the master craftsman Kitō Yūjirō during the Meiji and Taishō era.

Today companies such as Nippon Kodo, Shoyeido, and Baieido are some of the most established suppliers of incense.

== Material ==
The fragrant woods agarwood and sandalwood are the main ingredients used in Japanese incense. Agarwood is found in certain parts of southeast Asia such as Vietnam. Japanese incense companies divide agarwood into six categories depending on the region obtained and the properties of the agarwood. The trees secrete an aromatic resin, which over time turns the wood into kōboku. One particular grade of kōboku with a high oil content and superior fragrance is called kyara. Kyara is currently worth more than its weight in gold. Sandalwood originates primarily from India, Indonesia, southern China or other parts of southeast Asia. Sandalwood trees need around 60 years to produce their signature fragrance that can be deemed acceptable to be used for kōdō. The most valued sandalwood comes from Mysore in the state of Karnataka in India, where it is endangered. Makkō (which translates as "incense powder") is used to bind the ingredients together. It is able to bind ingredients while having little scent of its own.

Other materials used are cinnamon bark, chebulic myrobalan, clove, ginger lily, lavender, licorice, patchouli, spikenard, camomile, rhubarb, safflower, star anise, and other herbs. Shell fragrances and other animal-derived aromatic materials are also used.

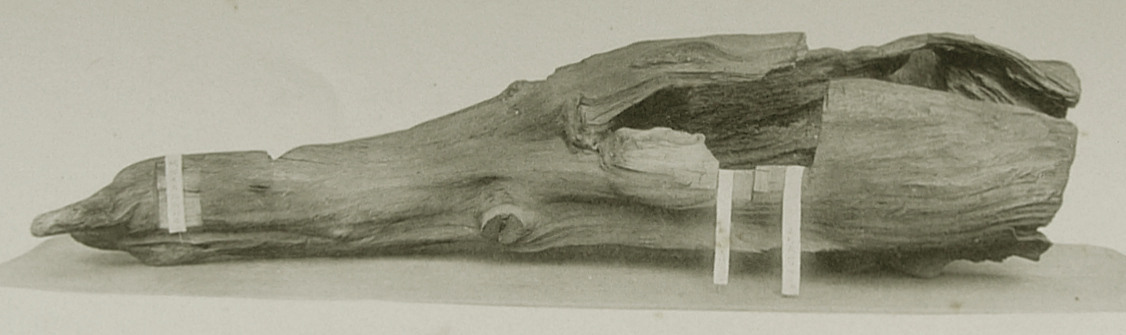
Ranjyatai, a historical kyara wood dating to the 10th century CE, kept at the Shōsōin treasury in Nara

Raw materials such as agarwood are becoming increasingly rare due to the depletion of the wild resource. This has made prime material very expensive. For example, the cost of lower grade kyara is about 20,000 yen per gram. Top quality kyara costs over 40,000 yen per gram, or many times the equivalent weight of gold (as of late 2012). If the particular piece of incense wood has a history, the price can be even higher. The highest regarded wood, Ranjatai, dates back to at least the 10th century and is kyara wood from Laos or Vietnam, and was used by emperors and warlords for its fragrance. It is said to contain so much resin that it can be used many times over. The wood is kept at the Shōsōin treasury in Nara, which is under the administration of the Imperial Household. The high costs and difficulty of obtaining acceptable raw material are some of the reasons why kōdō is not as widely practised or known compared to the art of flower arrangement or the tea ceremony.

== Types of incense ==
Sasaki Dōyo (1306–1373), who was regarded as a paragon of elegance and luxury and the quintessential military aristocrat during Nanboku-chō period, owned many incense woods and named them.

Shōgun Ashikaga Yoshimasa (1436–1490) himself appreciated precious scented woods and collected some or inherited them from Sasaki. In order to properly organise the large collection of incense wood, he appointed the experts of that time Sanjōnishi Sanetaka, who became the founder of the Oie School, and Shino Sōshin, the founder of the Shino School. They established a classifying system called rikkoku gomi, which means "six countries, five scents".

| Name | Character | rikkoku (country) | gomi (scent) |
|---|---|---|---|
| kyara | 伽羅 | Vietnam | bitter |
| rakoku | 羅国 | Thailand | sweet |
| manaka | 真那伽 | Malacca, Malaysia | no scent |
| manaban | 真南蛮 | unknown | salty |
| sasora | 佐曾羅 | India | hot |
| sumotara / sumontara | 寸聞多羅 | Sumatra, Indonesia | sour |

* Manaban comes from the word nanban which means "southern barbarian", and was brought to Japan by Portuguese traders with unknown origin.

== Incense makers ==
One of the oldest traditional incense companies in Japan is Baieido, founded in 1657 with roots going back to the Muromachi period. Ostensibly the longest standing incense maker is Kungyokudo, established in the third year of the Bunroku era (1594), and originally operating as an apothecary serving the Nishi Honganji Buddhist Temple in Kyoto. Other traditional and still operating companies include Kyukyodo (1663, Kyoto), and Shoyeido, founded in 1705 in Kyoto.

Incense manufacturer in Japan either imports aromatic raw materials directly from overseas or purchases them from specialized suppliers. Today, the number of companies dedicated to exclusively handling incense raw materials has declined drastically. Among the few remaining, Osagawa Nisaburo Shoten is well known for its expertise, experience in handling high quality raw materials. Osagawa Nisaburo Shoten supplies aromatic raw materials to variety of incense manufacturers across Japan. Nippon Kodo is also a major supplier of incense material.

Both Baieido and Shoyeido are used extensively by Zen Buddhist temples, both in Japan and worldwide. Nippon Kōdō was established by incorporation in New York City in August 1965 and is the largest seller of Japanese incense worldwide. Most of their incense is "everyday" quality (毎日 mainichi). They do make some "traditional" incense as well. These three are the major exporters of Japanese incense.

Currently, 70% of all of Japan's incense is manufactured on a small island south of Osaka called Awaji Island. The history extends back to 1850 in Ei of the city of Awaji in 1850 when Senshuu Sakai manufacturing technology was introduced. At the time, Ei was a military run trade port for the Tokushima Clan, which opened the door to the import and sale of raw materials used in making incense. Over time, the incense made in Awaji Island became renowned throughout Japan. The main reason incense manufacturing took root in Awaji Island is because of its nishi-kaze (west wind). This strong seasonal wind hampers the fishing industry, giving rise to the necessity for cottage industries such as incense making. This wind is also great for drying incense.

Kyūkyodō, Kunmeidō, and Kōkandō also sell some incense overseas. It may be difficult to find the other brands outside Japan. There are numerous other incense makers in Japan, of course. These are the either the major sellers or the oldest companies in Japan.

== Kōdō ==
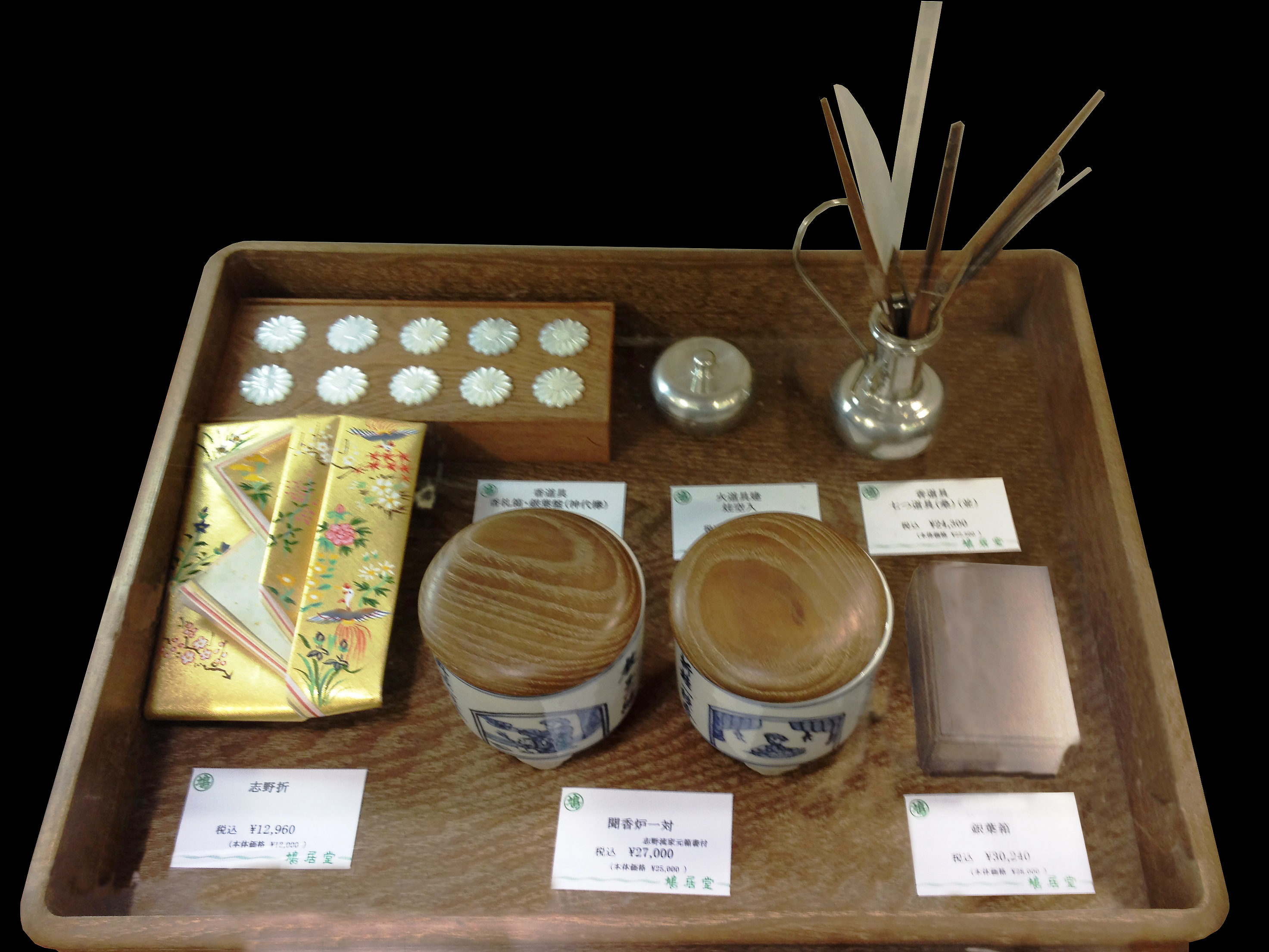
A set of utensils used for incense ceremony

Kōdō (香道; Way of Incense) is the Japanese art of appreciating incense, similar to the tea ceremony, in which participants follow established practises involving the preparation and enjoyment of incense. Though it is counted as one of the three classical arts of refinement, it is relatively unknown amongst modern Japanese people. Kōdō includes all aspects of the incense process – from the tools (kōdōgu (香道具)), which, much like tools of the tea ceremony, are valued as high art, to activities such the incense-comparing games kumikō and genjikō.

For kumikō, participants sit near one another and take turns smelling incense from a censer as they pass it around the group. Participants comment on and make observations about the incense, and play games to guess the incense material. Genjikō is one such game, in which participants are to determine which of five prepared censers contain different scents, and which contain the same scent. Players' determinations (and the actual answers) are recorded using genji-mon linear patterns, the elements of which allude to chapters in the Tale of Genji.

Apart from kōdō, incense can also be used during the tea ceremony or other functions. A variety of containers and censers, or kōro, made out of porcelain, wood, lacquer or other materials were created over the centuries for this purpose, such as kōgō, and kōbako, all of which can be supremely valuable items.

== See also ==
- Incense in China
