= Tie crane =

Railroad machine used to move ties

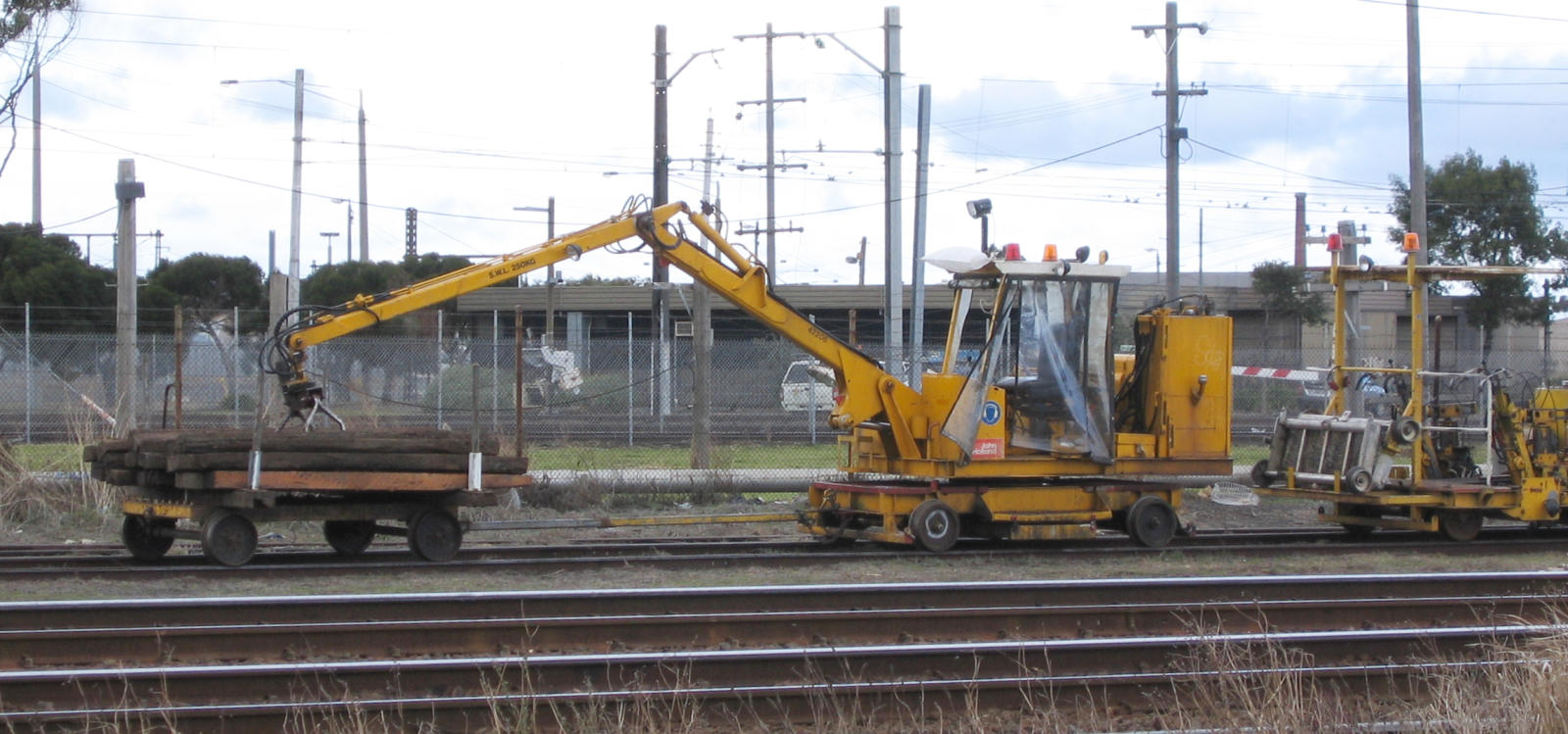
A tie crane and trolley laden with wooden ties

A tie crane or tie handler, is a piece of rail transport maintenance of way equipment used to move and handle the railroad ties (also known as sleepers) used in rail tracks using track relaying. The machines are used as an alternative to the manual labor once used. Tie cranes frequently work with tie extractor/inserters to replace ties as part of a section gang.

== History ==
Tie cranes were developed to speed up and automate the labor-intensive task of moving railroad ties, which typically weigh over 100 pounds (and as much as 500 pounds for concrete ties). Before tie cranes, track workers would move ties by hand, using tools such as tie tongs and lots of muscle. The tie crane allows one operator to move ties far faster than a group of track workers could move by hand.

== Design ==
The central feature of a tie crane is, of course, a crane. This crane extends the reach of the vehicle up to 25 feet from the tracks. It is used to move ties into position for other machines to insert into the track, pick up old ties that have been removed, and to stack old ties for disposal. Mounted on a lightweight chassis with rail wheels, the operators cab and lifting arm pivot on a base, enabling 360 degree rotation. The end of the lifting arm has a gripper for picking up ties, and a movable wrist to allow the tie to be positioned. Often a small trolley is connected to the tie crane by a drawbar, for either storage of new ties to be placed into the track, or for taking away old ties that have been removed. Tie cranes are self-propelled and powered by a diesel engine, and usually weigh under ten tons and have a top speed of 20 to 25 mph. The crane is normally capable of lifting at least 800 pounds, making it able to lift any type of size of tie. Some tie cranes are also equipped with clamps which grab onto the rails to stabilize the machine, for moving ties far away from the track.

Modern tie cranes offer more advanced features than their predecessors, including more advanced engines and hydraulic brakes.

Specialized versions of tie cranes exist for use on bridges, these are known as bridge cranes. Bridge cranes are equipped with rail clamps for added stability, and are specially designed to replace ties on bridges, along with bridge elements such as stringers.

== Road-rail tie cranes ==
While a tie crane is typically a strictly rail mounted vehicle, some manufacturers also offer road–rail vehicle versions, which have the added flexibility of being able to use roadways to move.

== Manufacturers of tie cranes ==
- Progress Rail (Kershaw)
- RCE Rail
- Vancer
- Brandt (Canadian manufacturer)
- Knox Kershaw
