= Ability (1878) =

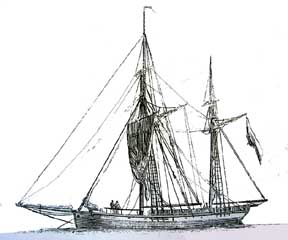
- A ketch-rigged vessel similar to Ability

History

New South Wales
- Name: Ability
- Owner: John Breckenridge
- Port of registry: Sydney
- Builder: William Woodward, Brisbane Water, NSW, Australia
- Ship registration number: 37/1878
- Ship official number: 74975
- Completed: 1878
- Fate: Wrecked 5 January 1897

General characteristics
- Type: Wooden ketch
- Tonnage: 48 GRT
- Length: 20.72 m
- Beam: 5.486 m
- Draught: 1.981 m

Ability was a wooden ketch of 48 tons, owned by J. Breckenridge and built at William Woodward in 1878. She ran aground at Cape Hawke, New South Wales, Australia, in 1897.

== Shipwreck ==
On 5 January 1897, traveling from Cape Hawke to Sydney with a load of timber, Ability broke her moorings and was beached at Cape Hawke, near Forster, New South Wales. There were no reported deaths.
