= Double knockout =

Double knockout may refer to:

- Gene knockout, a genetic technique in which two of an organism's genes is made inoperative.
- A rare fight-ending occurrence in several full-contact combat sports in which the participants knock each other out at the same time and are both unable to get back up before the count is over.
