= Baieido =

Japanese business company

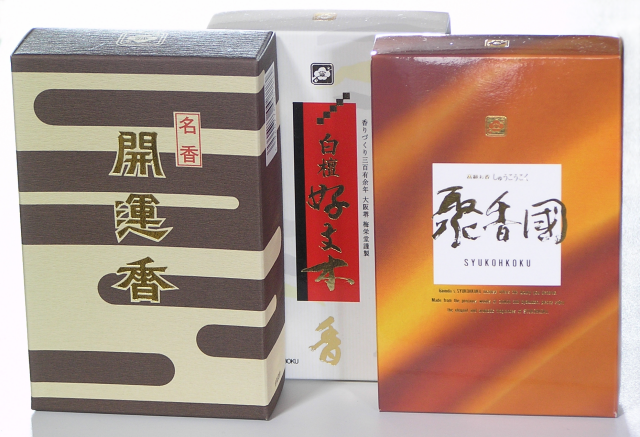
Baieido: Kai Un Ko, Byakudan Kobunboku, Shu Ko Koku

Baieido (Japanese language: 梅栄堂) is a Japanese incense company which traces its roots back to a wholesaler of medicinal herbs in Sakai, Osaka Prefecture who named himself "Jinkoya Sakubei" (agarwood trader) in 1657. As such, Baieido is commercially promoted as one of the oldest established incense makers in Japan.

Baieido's flagship and most popular incense is "Kobunboku" (Plum Blossom). Several of their other incenses are variations of Kōbunboku.

== History ==

Baieido trace themselves to the Muromachi period (1338-1573), when the founder of Baieido, Kakuuemon Yamatoya, became a wholesaler of medicinal herbs in Sakai city. Sakai was a well-known trading port in ancient Japan in which incense trading was in high demand. In 1657, the founder named himself "Jinkoya Sakubei" and specialized in selling incense ingredients and incense sticks. "Jinkoya" (Aloeswood trader) was a name peculiar to Sakai, only medicinal wholesalers who specialized in incense were authorized to use this name.

The method and recipes have been handed down from generation to generation in an unbroken secret oral tradition. The name "Baieido" is derived from the three characters bai, ei, and dō. Bai means "plum tree"; ei means "prosperity"; dō means "shrine or store"

== Sales catalogue ==
Baieido's flagship and most popular incense is "Kobunboku" (Plum Blossom). Several of their other incenses are based on Kobunboku.

Title	Description	Japanese
Kobunboku	Expression of the Plum Tree	好文木
Tokusen Kobunboku	Premium Kobunboku	特選好文木
Kaden Kobunboku	Family Secret	家伝好文木
Biko Kobunboku	Delicate	微香好文木
Biko Kobunboku	Delicate (Smokeless)	微香好文木（煙ひかえめ）
Jinko Kobunboku	Agarwood (Smokeless)	沈香好文木（煙ひかえめ）
Byakudan Kobunboku	White Sandalwood	白檀好文木
Sawayaka Kobunboku	Cinnamon	さわやか好文木
Kai Un Ko	Good Fortune	開運香
Shu Ko Koku	Gathering of Fragrant Countries	聚香国
Tokusen Shu Ko Koku	Premium Shu Ko Koku	特選聚香国
	Jinkoya Sakube Series	沈香屋作兵衛
Byakudan Kokonoe Ko	Incense of the Imperial Palace	白檀九重香
Jinko Horyu Ko	Phoenix & Dragon	沈香鳳龍 香
Gokujyo Jinko Kunsho Ko	Rising Scent	極上沈香薫昇香
	Premium Series	
Tokusen Kokonoe	Premium Byakudan Kokonoe Ko	特撰九重
Tokusen Horyu	Premium Jinko Horyu Ko	特撰鳳龍
Tokusen Kunsho	Premium Gokujyo Jinko Kunsho Ko	特撰薫昇
Tokusen Koshiboku	Timbers of Confucius	特撰孔子木
Tokusen Koen	Garden Incense	特撰香苑
Kyara Koko	Ancient Scent	伽羅古香
