= Capable =

Capable may refer to:

- USS Capable (AM-155), a World War II minesweeper
- USNS Capable, an ocean surveillance ship
- the defining property of a member of a capable group in mathematics
