= Knockouts (salon) =

American salon chain

- Type: Private
- Founded: 2002
- Founder: Thomas P. Friday, Karin Friday,
- Headquarters: Irving, Texas, United States
- Website: knockouts.com

Knockouts and Knockouts Haircuts for Men are the trade names of a privately held American salon chain (international as of early 2011), Knockouts LLC, based in Irving, Texas. Knockouts are full-service grooming salons with a boxing (and mixed martial arts) theme targeting men. The salons have a gym/warehouse-like decor with faux boxing ring posts and ropes and a brick wall helping to define the space, as well as boxing photos and memorabilia on the walls. There are flat-screen televisions at each grooming station and in the waiting area.

Knockouts employs an all-female staff. The services include haircuts, hair coloring, waxing, manicures, pedicures, and six types of massage therapy. Knockouts salons provide a free beverage to customers while they wait, including water, sports drinks and beer (where legally permitted). Knockouts has sold over 500 franchised salons in 29 states.

== History ==
The enterprise was founded as a limited partnership by Thomas P. Friday, his wife, Karin in Dallas, Texas in the summer of 2002. The first Knockouts salon opened on October 3, 2003 in Addison, Texas. In January 2005, the Fridays bought majority control in the partnership. The partnership was converted to a limited liability company, Knockouts LLC, in January 2008 and is now based in Irving, Texas. Tom Friday is chief executive officer of the company, while Karin Friday is President and Steve Turman is chief compliance officer.
