= Knockout (Indonesian TV series) =

- Created by: Fuji Television Network, Inc.
- Presented by: John Martin Tumbel; Nabila Putri
- Country of origin: Indonesia
- No. of seasons: 1

Production
- Running time: 60 menit
- Production company: FremantleMedia (PT Dunia Visitama Produksi)

Original release
- Network: Indosiar
- Release: 2013

Knockout is an Indonesian television game show which was adopted from the merger of two programs: Boxing Gloves and Face It, and was produced by FremantleMedia for Indosiar. Boxing Glove itself is the latest edition of the game show Hole in the Wall that was shown in RCTI and Global TV. This show is aired every Wednesday-Friday: 4:00 pm. The hosts are John Martin and Nabila Putri.
