= Tie exchanger =

Exchanger for railway ties or sleepers

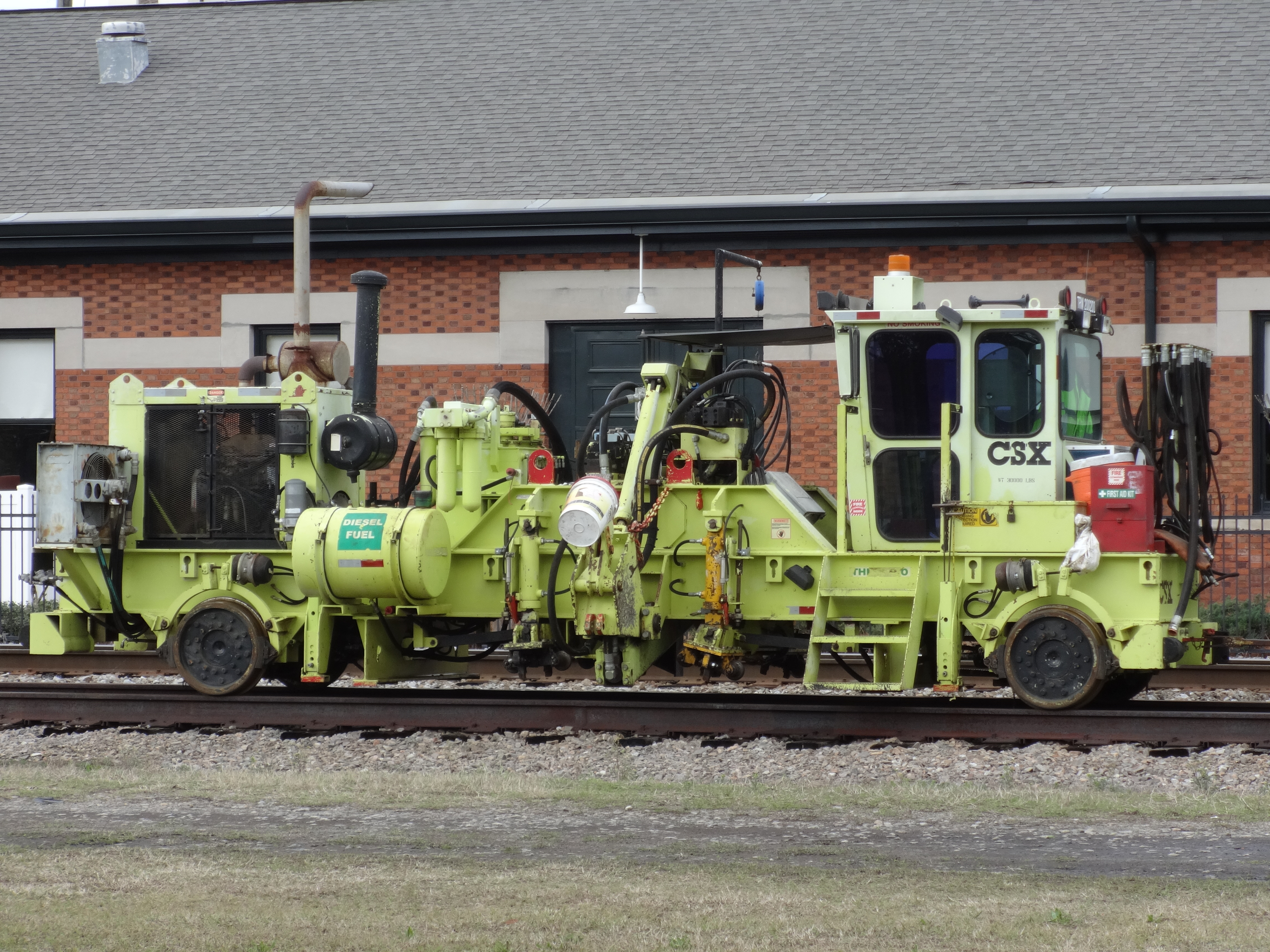
A CSX tie exchanger in Waycross, Georgia, USA. The arm that grabs and moves ties can be seen at the center of the vehicle just above the rails. On either side of it are two of the clamps used to lift the rail. Two more clamps are in corresponding positions on the opposite side of the vehicle.

A tie exchanger (also known as a TKO for Tie Knock Out, or by various combinations of tie exchanger, extractor, replacer, inserter or TRIPP) is a self-propelled railroad maintenance of way vehicle that removes old railroad ties (also known as sleepers) from tracks and inserts new ones. By using mechanical and hydraulic force, a tie extractor/inserter can replace ties much faster and with more precision than is possible by hand.

The TKO is distinct from the track renewal train, a much more complex machine which replaces the entirety of the rails and ties at once.

== History ==
While wooden railroad ties are treated with preservatives such as creosote to resist decay, they do not last forever and must be replaced every 20 to 40 years, depending on factors such as climate and the type of wood used. In particularly wet climates, replacement must occur more frequently as the ties rot faster. Ties may also need to be replaced regardless of age after derailments, washouts, or other events that cause tie damage.

In the early days of railroads, ties had to be inserted and removed by hand, using tools such as tie tongs. The wooden railroad ties, weighing in excess of 100 pounds each, required a great deal of muscle to be moved. Track workers would also need to dig ties out of the ballast to free them before they could be removed, and to lift the rails using large track jacks. The amount of labor involved made tie replacement slow work. Just one mile of track includes 3,249 wooden railroad ties, and a typical railroad will need to replace approximately 2 to 4 percent of its ties each year. As an example, commuter railroad Metra maintains approximately 400 miles of track, and this translates to between 30,000 and 50,000 ties needing replacement per year.

Faced with the need to replace tens or even hundreds of thousands of ties along their networks along hundreds or thousands of miles of tracks each year, in the 20th century railroads realized that they could save time and money (and broken backs of employees) by developing machines which could mechanize the process of tie replacement. Eliminating the need for hand tools and shoveling, the diesel-powered tie extractor/inserter allows just one man or woman to do in just minutes what used to require an hour for an entire section crew working by hand.

Today, while track workers may still do minor tie replacement jobs by hand, any significant tie replacement work calls for the services of a tie extractor/inserter to reduce the amount of time that tracks must be out of service for maintenance. Under the control of a skilled operator, as many as seven ties can be replaced per minute, a speed of operation that far surpasses what can be achieved by manual labor. A track crew using TKOs can replace as many as 1,000 ties each day. Tie extractors/inserters are essential for replacing concrete ties, which can weigh as much as 500 pounds, making them impossible to be moved by hand.

== Design ==
A typical TKO has two key components: an arm to grab and manipulate ties, and clamps which can be lowered to grab onto and lift the tracks. Most machines only have one arm, which can only work on the side of the vehicle on which it is installed (for most vehicles, this is the right hand side). With one arm, all extracted ties must be deposited on one side of the tracks, and all new ties to be inserted must also be placed on this same side. More comprehensive tie extractors/inserters have two arms, one on each side, which eliminates this limitation. On machines with one arm, it is usually possible to compensate for the limitation of only one arm by using a small turntable which is placed under the track, and allows the TKO to rotate 180 degrees.

The boom which the arm is attached to is capable of rotating around 10 to 20 degrees away from perpendicular to the tracks, and can also lift approximately 25 degrees upwards and 15 degrees downwards with respect to the plane of the tracks. This flexibility is needed to make sure all ties can be grabbed, as they may vary somewhat in alignment, especially new ties which are left on the adjacent roadbed to be inserted.

Tie extractors/inserters are normally designed for use with wooden railroad ties in North America, with some exceptions. Different grippers are installed on the arms for use with heavier and stronger concrete ties. For use with the special longer ties on railroad switches, dedicated machines also exist.

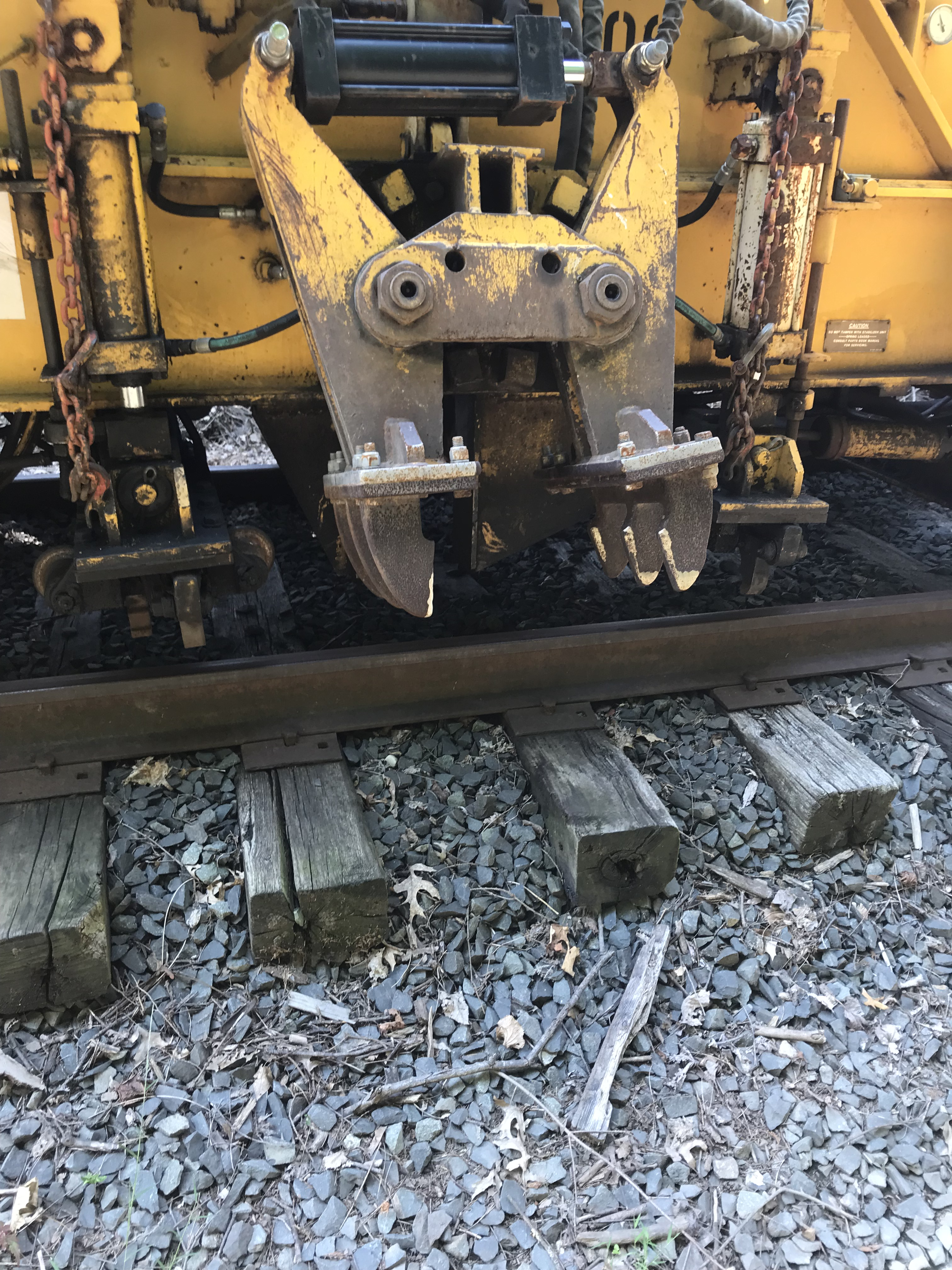
A close up view of the arm used to grab ties, along with two of the four rail clamps.

== Method of operation ==
Before a tie extractor/inserter can begin work, railroad workers must perform several tasks to prepare. They will inspect the track where the machine will operate, marking damaged ties for removal using spray paint or some other form of identification. Once the track crew has determined roughly how many ties will need to be replaced, new ties will be delivered to the area and positioned trackside using a tie crane. When this preparation is complete, the tie extractor/inserter will arrive to begin its work.

A typical tie inserter uses the following process to replace a tie:

1. The tie extractor/inserter arrives on site, and begins its work by identifying a tie for removal.
2. The operator stops the vehicle so the arm is positioned directly above the tie to be removed, and then drops rollers which have clamps attached to them. These clamps grab the rails and lift them slightly to make extracting the tie easier. The rollers will typically be left lowered while the machine is working. Before grabbing the tie, the clamps will be engaged.
3. The operator lowers the arm onto the end of the tie and grabs the tie. He or she then extends the arm, which is attached to a telescoping boom, laterally away from the track, extracting the tie.
4. Still holding the tie, the operator disengages the clamps and moves the machine to a nearby location and deposits the extracted tie trackside, where it will later be removed for disposal.
5. The operator moves the vehicle to a new tie which has been positioned trackside.
6. Using the arm, the operator grabs the new tie and moves the machine to the location where the old tie was removed.
7. After engaging the clamps, in the opposite of what happened in step 3, the new tie is positioned underneath the track by the arm and then released when positioned appropriately.
8. The previous steps are repeated for each tie in need of replacement. When finished, the tie extractor/inserter lifts the rollers and departs.

On busier lines where work must be finished quickly, a different process will be used to speed up tie replacement. Two tie extractors/inserters will be used as part of a larger track gang. The first will remove all the ties to be replaced, and will be followed by a tie crane that picks up the old ties and drops off new ones. Following the tie crane, a second tie extractor/inserter will install all the new ties.

== Manufacturers ==
- Nordco
- Harsco
- RCC Fabricators
- Knox Kershaw
