= Kyukyodo =

Japanese retail store

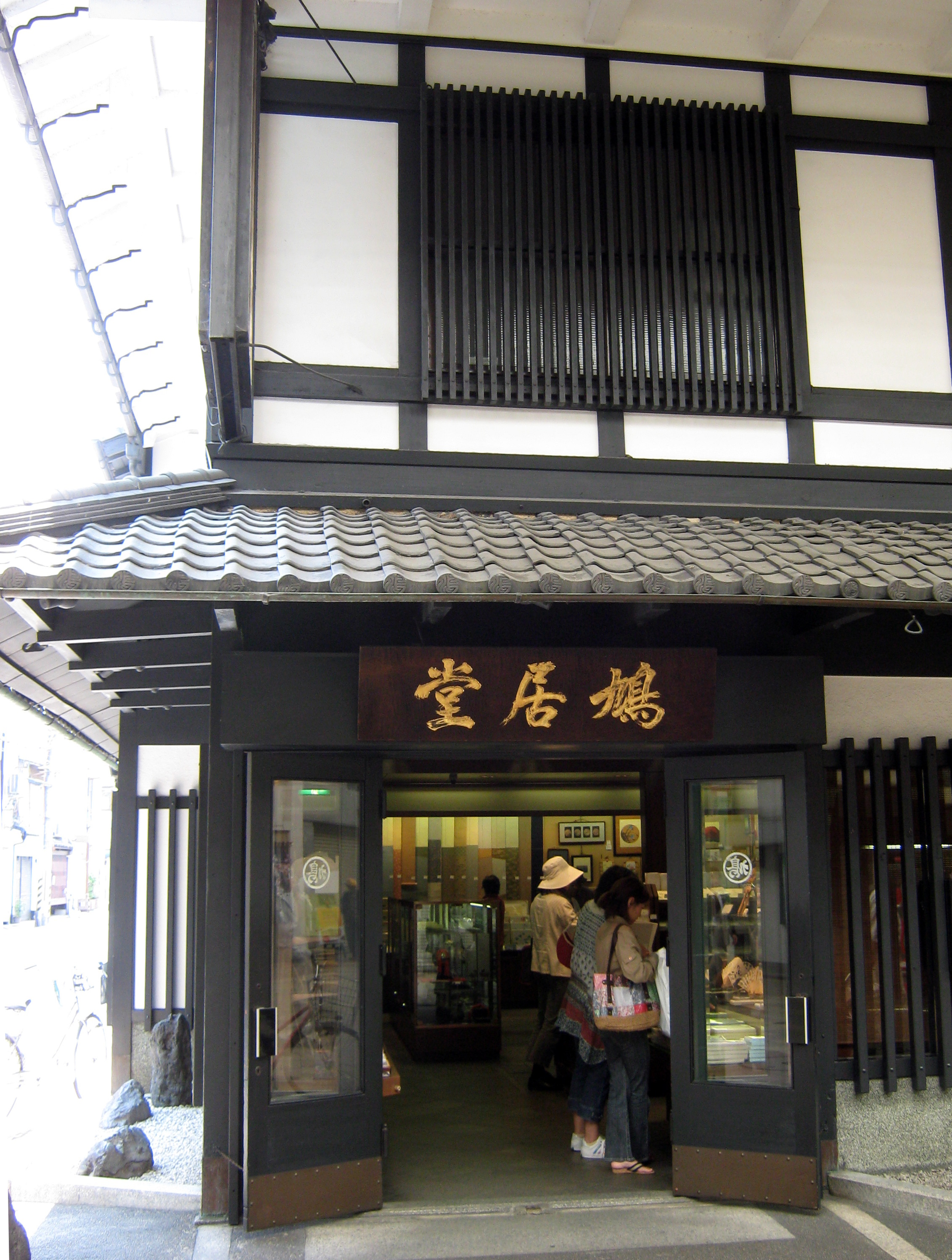
The main Kyukyodo store in Kyoto, Japan

Kyūkyodō (鳩居堂) is a Japanese retail store that specializes in traditional Japanese paper goods, incense, Asian calligraphy supplies, and books. It was founded in 1663 as a pharmacy. From 1891 to 1945, it was the official stationer to the Imperial House of Japan. Its headquarters and first store are in Shimogyō-ku, Kyoto, while there are branch stores in Tokyo at Ginza, Ikebukuro, Shibuya, Shinjuku, Marunouchi, and Yokohama.

== See also ==
- List of oldest companies
