= Capability =

A capability is the ability to execute a specified course of action or to achieve a desired outcome.

Capability may also refer to:

== Business, economics, science and engineering ==
- Capability (systems engineering), the ability to execute a specified course of action
- Capability approach
- Capability-based security
- Capability management
  - Capability management in business
- Capability Maturity Model Integration

== Persons ==
- Capability Brown (1716–1783), English landscape artist nicknamed "Capability"

== See also ==
- Capability Scotland, a Scottish charity
- Capable (disambiguation)
