= Knock Out (tabletop game) =

Tabletop game by Milton Bradley from 1992

- Other names: Bob the Builder: Bricklaying Game; Sloper!
- Publishers: Milton Bradley
- Publication: 1991; 35 years ago
- Years active: 1991–?
- Genres: Tabletop game
- Languages: English
- Players: 2–8
- Playing time: 30'
- Age range: 7+

Knock Out is a family tabletop game for two or more players published by the Milton Bradley Company in 1991.

== Gameplay ==
The players set up a wall of plastic bricks of various colors, with a special large "Knockout" brick embedded in the center of the wall. On their turn, the active player rolls a color-coded die and then must remove a brick of the corresponding color from the wall with a small battery-powered "jackhammer". If the player is successful, the brick is placed on top of the wall, and play continues. If the player knocks more than one brick out of the wall, but the special "Knockout" brick remains in place, the brick that the player was attempting to remove is set on top of the wall, and the other downed bricks are removed from the game. If, however, the special "Knockout" brick is dislodged and hits the table, the offending player is eliminated, the remaining players rebuild the wall, and another round is played. This continues until only one player is left.

Each game takes about 15-20 minutes to play. The jackhammer, known in the game as the "Rammer Hammer", uses two AA batteries.

== Reception ==
In 1992, FamilyFun declared Knock Out one of the best new games for children aged 8–10.

In a retrospective review in 2018, Eric Mortensen compared this to other stacking games requiring dexterity such as Jenga, saying, "The electric hammer does a good job of differentiating Knock Out from other similar games but at its core it is still a pretty average dexterity game." He also noted that "Like all stacking games where you begin with a built tower, you will spend close to as much time building the wall as you do playing a round." He warned potential buyers that "if you have never liked stacking games like Jenga, Knock Out is not going to be for you. If you want a more challenging game it also won’t be for you." He concluded by giving the game an average rating of 3 out of 5 stars, stating that for people who liked stacking games, "If you can get a good deal on Knock Out, I think it is worth looking into."
