= Senuma Kayō =

Japanese translator and teacher (1875–1915)

- Born: December 11, 1875; Takasaki, Gunma
- Died: February 28, 1915 (aged 39)
- Occupations: translator and teacher
- Known for: translated Russian literature directly to Japanese.
- Spouse: Senuma Kakusaburo

Senuma Kayō (Japanese: 瀬沼夏葉; December 11, 1875 – February 28, 1915) was a Japanese translator and teacher. She was the first woman to translate Russian literature to Japanese.

== Early life and education ==
Senuma was born Ikuko Yamada on December 11, 1875, in what is now Takasaki, Gunma. She grew up as a member of the Eastern Orthodox church, and attended a religious girls' school in Surugadai, Tokyo. She earned excellent grades and graduated in 1892. After graduation she began writing for a literary magazine, and was published in many issues. In 1896 she received Russian books from Nicholas of Japan, and learned to read them with the help of Senuma Kakusaburo, a priest at the Tokyo Resurrection Cathedral. They married in 1897 and had six children.

== Career ==
Kakusaburo introduced her to Ozaki Kōyō, who took her on as a disciple and welcomed her into his literary group. She published many of her early translations jointly with him until his death in 1903. Senuma was also on the staff of the Seito feminist literary magazine.

Senuma primarily translated works by Anton Chekov and Fyodor Dostoevsky. She was the first Japanese woman to translate directly from Russian to Japanese during a time when many Japanese translators translated from English. One of her most well-known translations was a partial translation of Dostoevsky's Poor Folk, from which she only translated Varvara's story. She also translated Chekov's Uncle Vanya and The Cherry Orchard, Aleksei Nicholaevich Budischev's Northeast Wind, and works by Ivan Turgenev. Her penname was Senuma Kayō. She visited Russia twice, once in 1909 and again in 1911.

There is some concern that some of her translations, most notably an incomplete translation of Leo Tolstoy's Anna Karenina, were actually translated by her husband. Scholar Satoko Kan suggests that while Anna Karenina was probably translated by Kakusaburo, Poor Folk was not.

Senuma died on February 28, 1915, from complications while giving birth to her seventh child.

== See also ==
- Futabatei Shimei
