= List of railway vehicles =

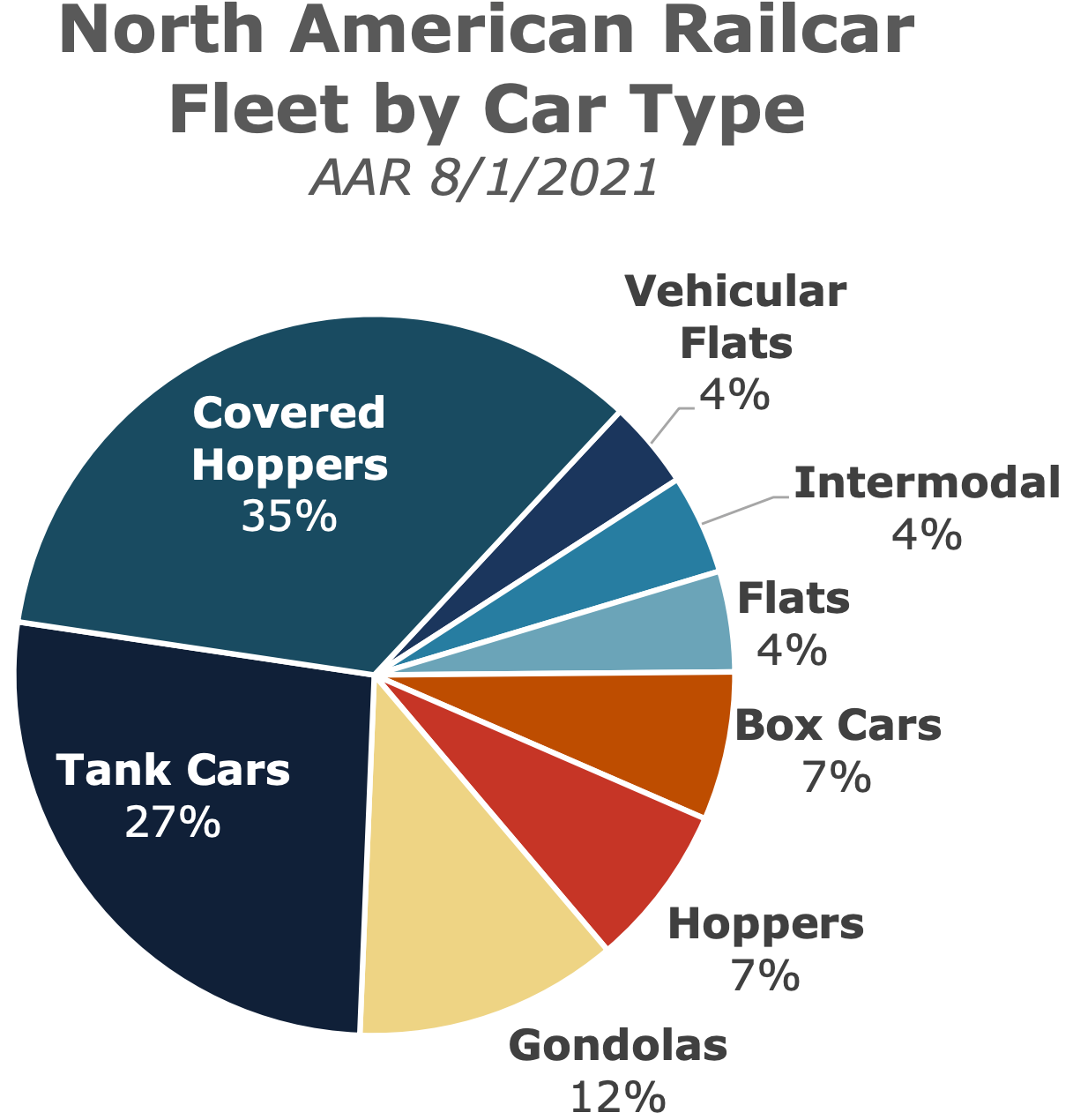
North American railway car fleet by car type

This is a list of all types of vehicle that can be used on a railway, either specifically for running on the rails, or for maintenance or up-keep of a railway.

== General classes of railway vehicle ==
- Freight car (US)
- Goods wagon (UIC)
- High speed train
- Locomotive
- Multiple unit
  - Diesel Multiple Unit
  - Electric Multiple Unit
- Passenger car or coach
- Private railroad car
- Railcar or Railbus
- Rail motor coach
- Road-rail vehicle
- Rolling stock
- Tilting train
- Travelling Post Office

== Railway vehicles listed by usage ==
=== Traction vehicles or propelled cars ===
- Autorail
- Cab car or Control car (rail)
- Driving Van Trailer
- Driving Brake Standard Open
- Shunter or Switcher
- Tank locomotive

=== Passenger use ===
- Baggage car
- Bilevel car
- Coach (rail)
- Comet (railcar)
- Compartment coach
- Corridor coach
- Couchette car
- Dining car
- Dome car
- Observation car
- Open coach
- Parlor car
- Shoreliner
- Sleeping car
- Slip coach
- Superliner (railcar)

=== Freight use ===
==== Container use ====
- Boxmotor
- CargoSprinter
- Conflat
- Double-stack car
- Megafret

==== Bulk freight ====
- Boxcar (US)
- Centerbeam cars
- Covered hopper
- Covered wagon (UIC)
- Double door boxcar
- Flatcar
- Gondola (rail) (US)
- Goods wagon
- Hicube boxcars
- Hopper car
- Open wagon (UIC)
- Refrigerator car (US)
- Refrigerated van (UIC)
- Tank car (US), Tank wagon (UIC)

==== Special use ====
- Aircraft parts car
- Autorack
- Coil car (rail)
- Lowmac
- Mineral wagon
- Quarry tub
- Schnabel car
- Slate wagon
- Stock car (rail)

==== Multi-modal ====
- Intermodal car
- Modalohr Road Trailer Carriers
- Roadrailer
- Well car

=== Ancillary vehicles ===
- Brake van
- Caboose
- Crane (railroad)
- Handcar
- Rollbock wagon
- Scale test car
- Transporter wagon
- Outfit Car or a Camp Car

=== Military use ===
- Railroad plough
- Railway gun
- Troop sleeper

=== Maintenance of Rail vehicles ===
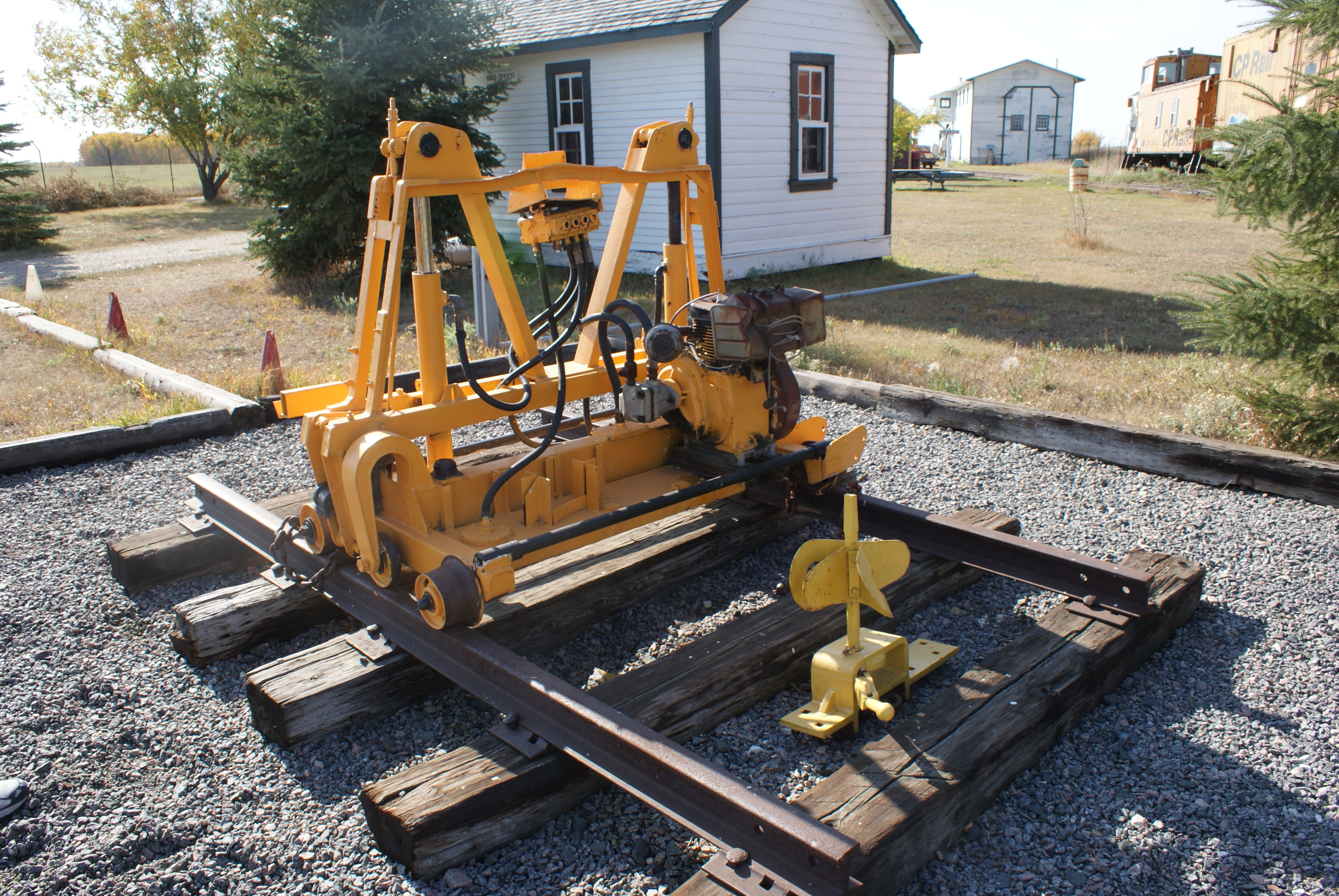
Comboliner, used to align rails

- Adzer/Cribber
- Anchor machine
- Ballast cleaner
- Ballast regulator
- Ballast tamper
- Catenary maintenance vehicle
- Clearance car
- Comboliner
- Crew car
- Dynamometer car
- Flanger
- Handcar
- HiRail truck
- OTM reclaimer (scrap loader)
- Railgrinder
- Rail heater
- Rotary snowplow
- Speedswing
- Speeder
- Spike puller
- Spiker
- Spiker gauger
- Tie crane
- Tie extractor/inserter
- Tie Spacer
- Track geometry car
- Track renewal train
- TR10

== Railway vehicles listed alphabetically ==
=== A ===
- Aircraft parts car
- Autorack
- Autorail
- Aérotrain

=== B ===
- Baggage car
- Ballast cleaner
- Ballast regulator
- Ballast tamper
- Bilevel car
- Boxcab
- Boxcar
- Boxmotor
- Brake van

=== C ===
- Cab car
- Caboose
- CargoSprinter
- Centerbeam cars
- Clearance car
- Coach (rail)
- Conflat
- Container car
- Coil car (rail)
- Comboliner
- Comet (passenger car)
- Control car (rail)
- Couchette car
- Covered hopper
- Crane (railroad)
- Crew car

=== D ===
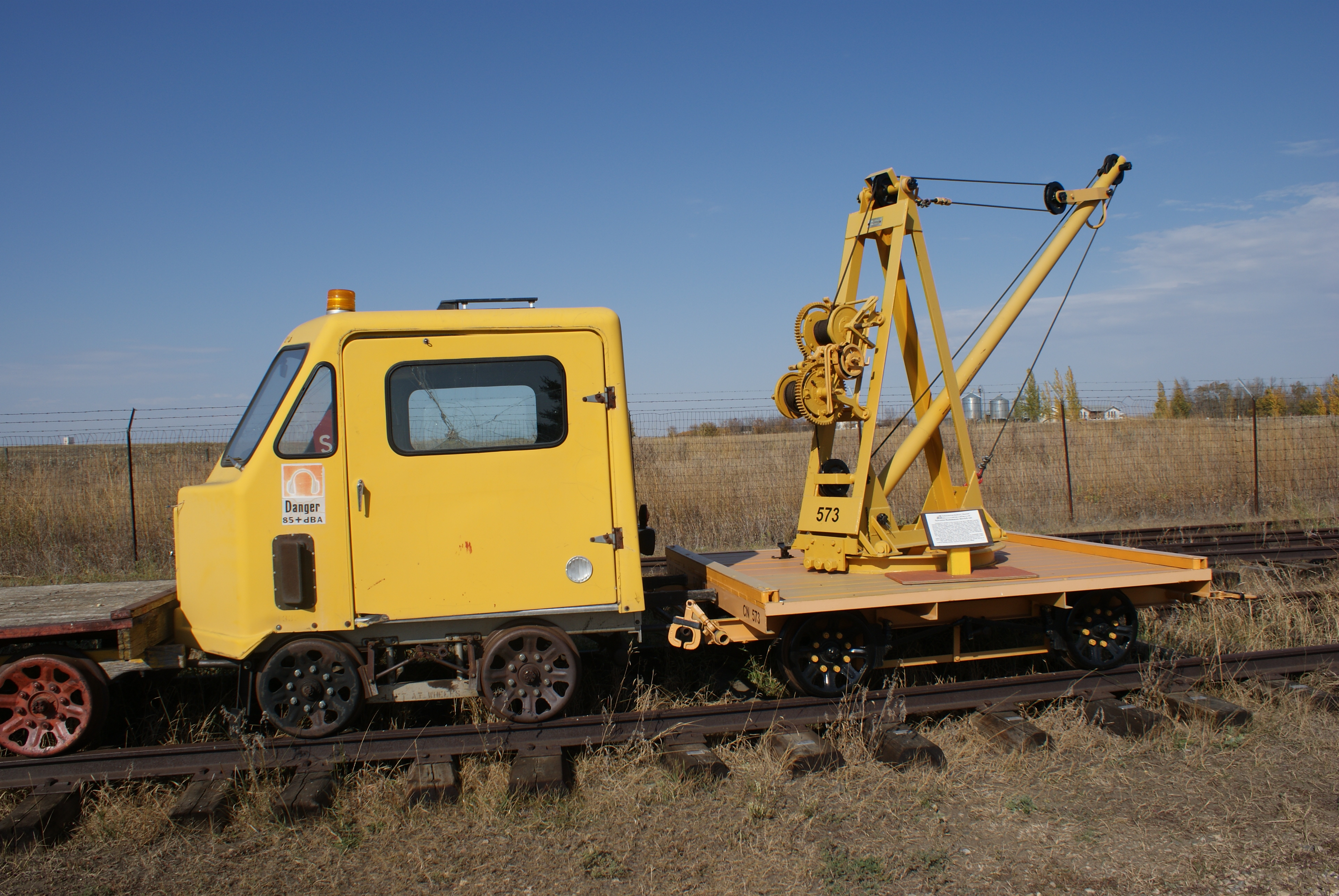
CNR derrick car (Sylvester Manufacturing Company, Kalamazoo Railway Supply Company. Mounted on a push car, pulled with a speeder or draisine.

- Derrick car
- Diesel Multiple Unit
- Dining car
- Dome car
- Double door boxcar
- Double-stack car
- Draisine
- Driving Van Trailer
- Driving Brake Standard Open
- Dynamometer car

=== E ===
- Electric Multiple Unit

=== F ===
- Flatcar
- Flanger
- Freight car

=== G ===
- General Utility Van
- Gondola (rail)
- Grain car

=== H ===
- Handcar
- Hicube boxcar
- High speed train
- HiRail truck
- Hopper car

=== L ===
- Locomotive
- Lowmac

=== M ===
- Megafret
- Modalohr road trailer carriers
- Multiple unit

=== O ===
- Observation car
- Outfit Car or a Camp Car

=== P ===
- Pacer (train)
- Passenger car (rail)
- Pendolino
- Private railroad car

=== R ===
- Rail ambulance
- Railcar
- Railgrinder
- Rail motor coach
- Railroad plough
- Railway gun
- Refrigerator car
- Revenue collection cars
- Roadrailer
- Road-rail vehicle
- Rollbock wagon
- Rotary snowplow

=== S ===
- Scale test car
- Schnabel car
- Shunter
- Slate wagon
- Sleeping car
- Slip coach
- Speeder
- Spiker
- Steam locomotive
- Steam railcar
- Stock car (rail)
- Superliner (railcar)
- Switcher

=== T ===
- Tamper
- Tank car
- Tank locomotive
- Tender
- Tower car
- Track geometry car
- Track renewal train
- Transporter wagon
- Travelling Post Office
- Troop sleeper
