= Flanger (railroad) =

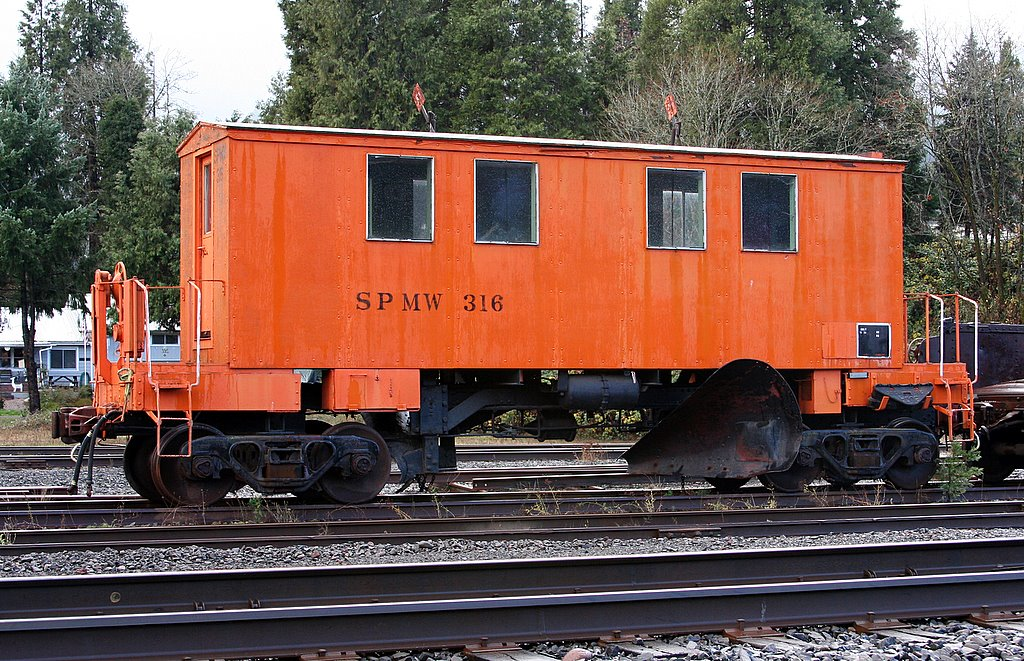
A Southern Pacific Railroad flanger in Oakridge, Oregon

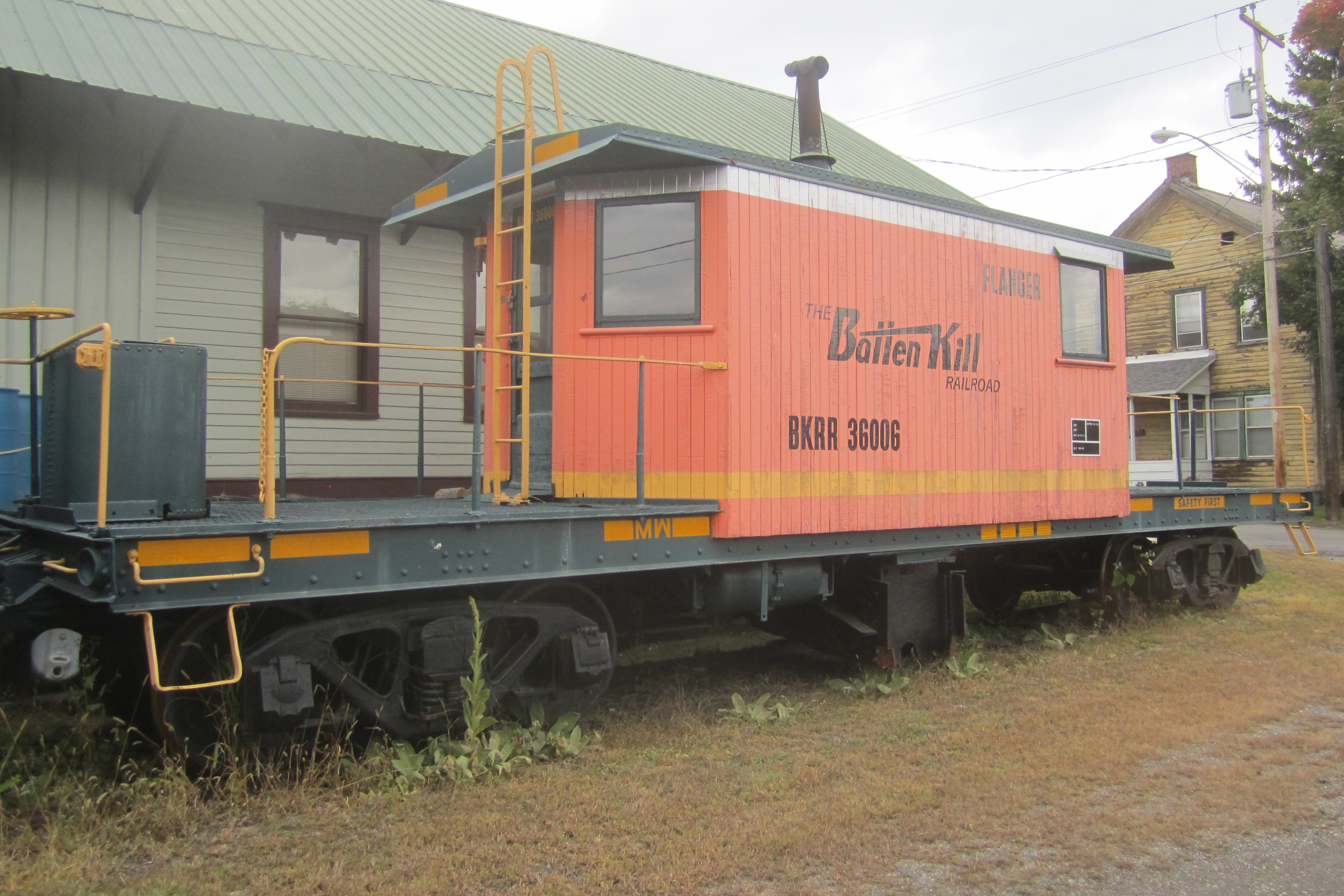
A Batten Kill Railroad flanger

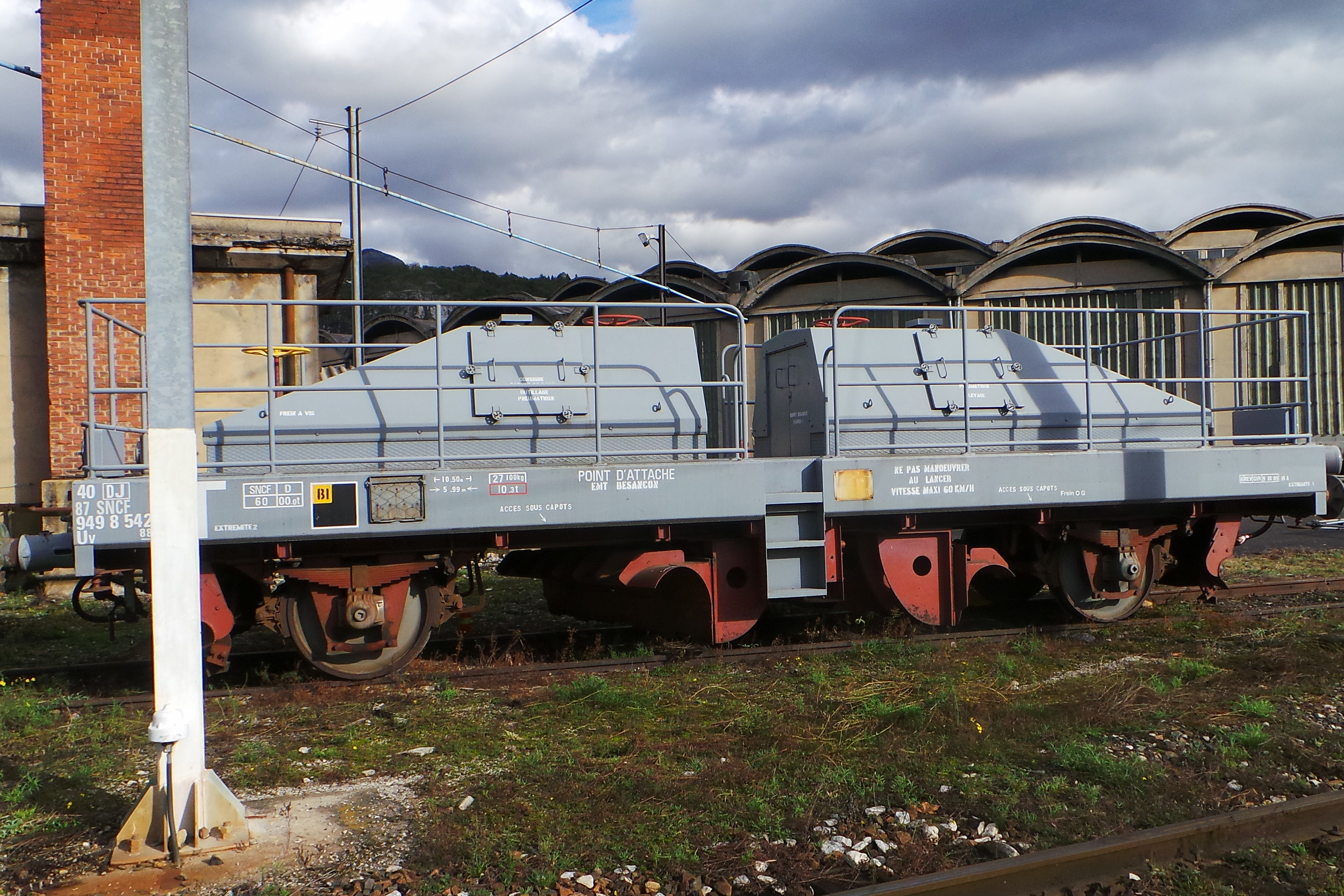
A French railway flanger with four blades for bi-directional operation

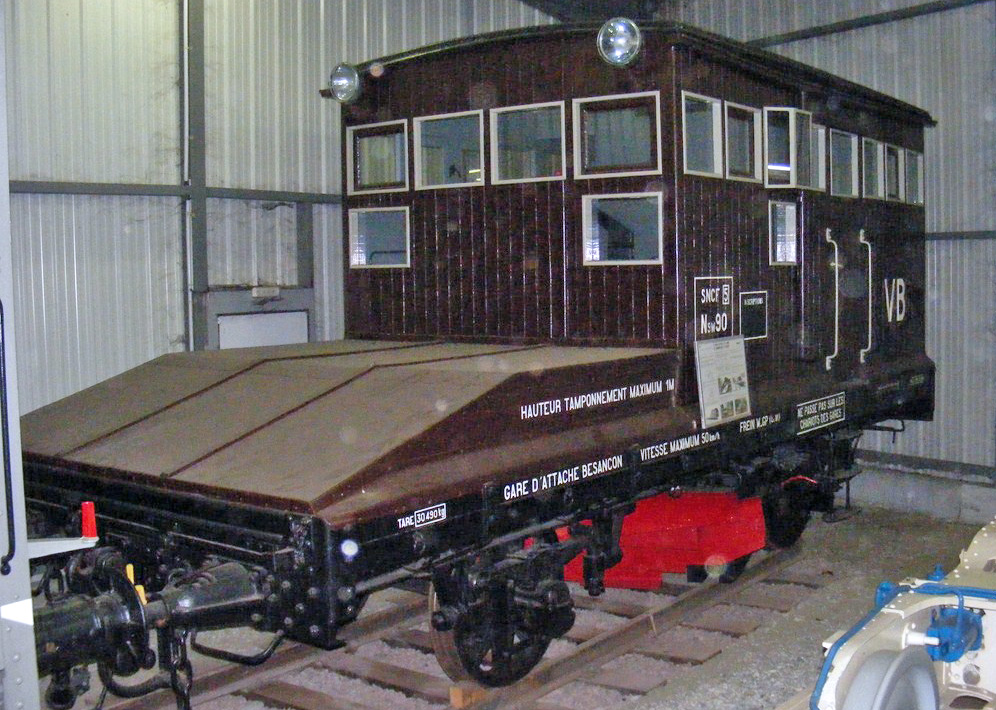
An earlier French flanger with a single blade

A flanger (also known as a scraper or digger) is a railroad car that clears the space between the rails, generally of ice and snow. While a wedge plow can remove snow above the surface of the rails, the flanger removes snow and ice from below the surface of the rails where the railway wheel flanges fit. Railway locomotives and cars can be derailed if the flangeway is filled.

The flanger blades are lowered below the head of the rail. Blades typically throw the snow and ice to the left of the left rail and to the right of the right rail. Some flangers have a single V-shaped blade extending between both rails while others with a separate blade for each rail are better adapted to lines with guard rails. Some blades work while the car moves either frontwards or backwards, while other flangers have one blade for forward movement and a different blade for backward movement. While early railway wedge plows required a separate flanger, many modern plows also include flanger blades.

To avoid damaging the flanger blades, the operator must raise them when the flanger car approaches a railroad switch or grade crossing. In regions where flangers are often used, signs are posted alongside the tracks to alert the operators to raise the blade.
