= Railroad plough =

Rail vehicle used to destroy railroad ties, making tracks unusable

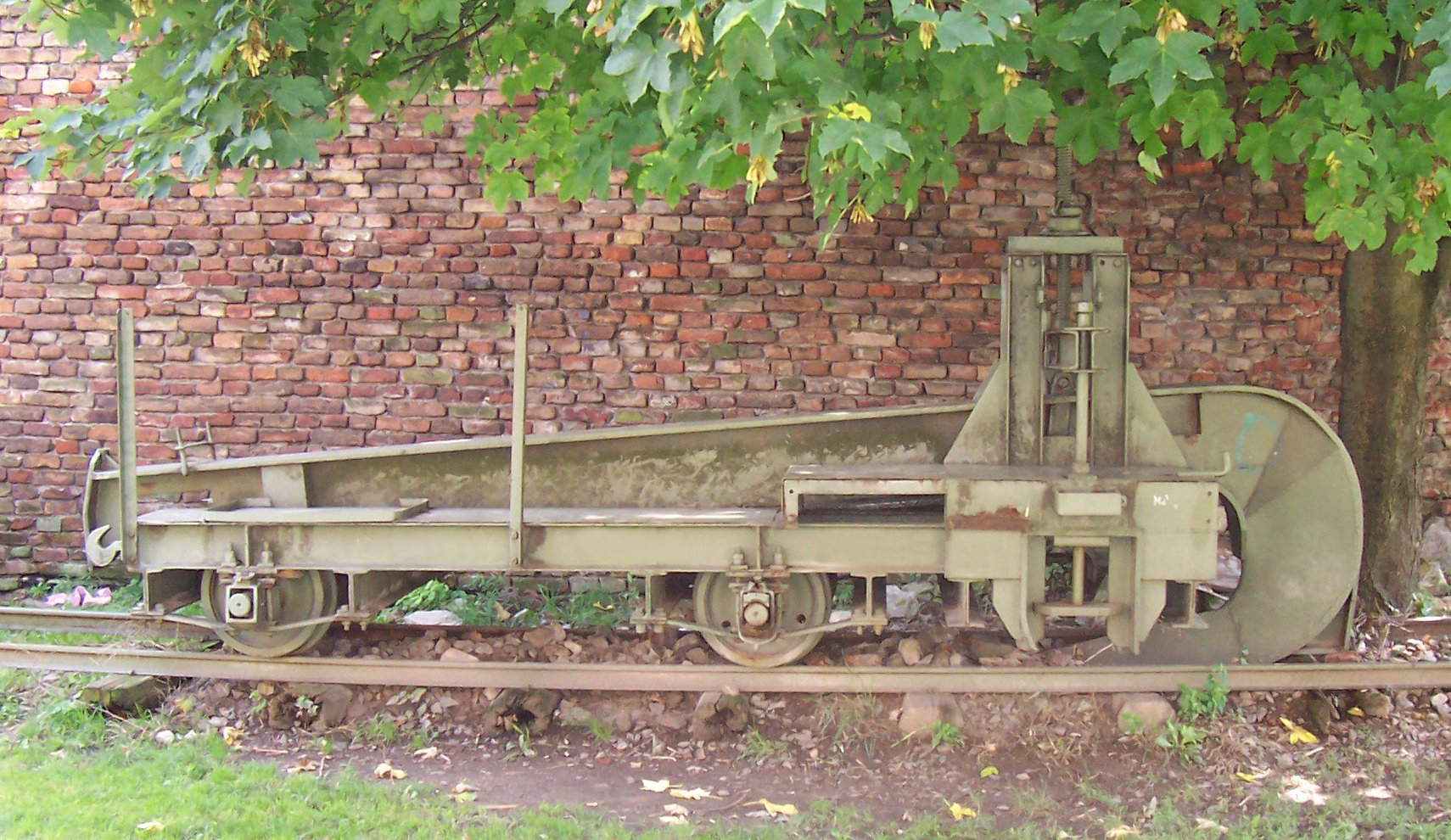
Railroad plough from the Military Museum in Belgrade. The hook can be raised for transportation or lowered for track destruction.

A railroad plough is a rail vehicle which supports an immensely strong, hook-shaped plough. It is used for destruction of railroad ties (sleepers) in warfare, as part of a scorched earth policy, so that the track becomes unusable for the enemy.

In use, the plough is lowered to rip up the middle of the track as it is hauled along by a locomotive. This action breaks the wooden ties (sleepers) which forces the steel rails out of alignment, making the line impassable by later rail vehicles. Bridges and signalling equipment also suffer serious damage.

== Deployment ==
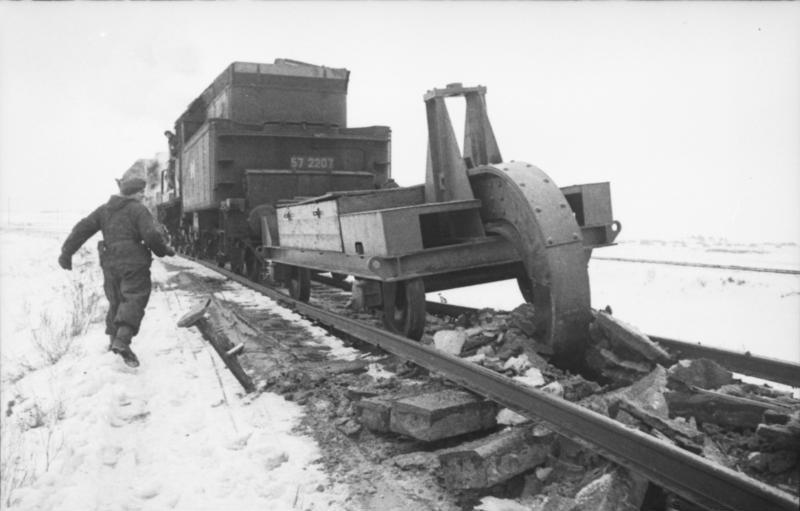
German railroad plough in action, Belarus (1944)

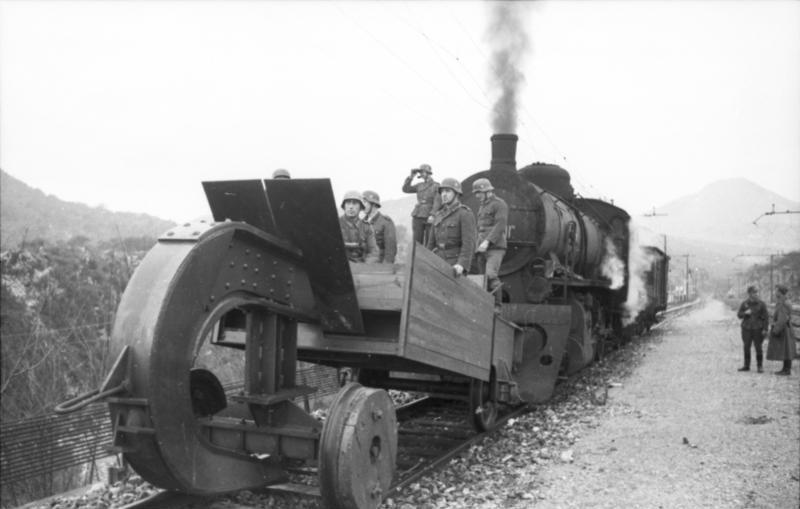
German railroad plough in Italy (1944)

A similar device, which ripped the rail off the ties, had been used by railway troops of the Imperial Russian Army in World War I, during their retreat from Galicia and Poland. Railroad ploughs were in use by the Czechoslovak Army during the German occupation in 1938, and by German Wehrmacht armed forces retreating northward through Italy and westward from the Eastern Front in World War II.

The German author Arno Schmidt (1914–1979) in his post-war novel Leviathan uses the image of a railroad plough as a symbol of evil.

== Surviving vehicles ==
Location	Image	Description
Belgrade Military Museum		A plough is on its permanent outer exhibition.
Historical Museum of Bosnia and Herzegovina		A plough is displayed in front of the museum.
Victory Park on the Poklonnaya Hill		A replica of a German railroad plough is on display.
Unknown		A captured German World War II example was kept at the Longmoor Military Railway. This might have since been transferred to the care of the UK's National Army Museum.

== See also ==
- Sherman's neckties – A railway destruction tactic used in the American Civil War by the Union to prevent the Confederacy from using the tracks by making them difficult to repair.
- Nero Decree – Hitler's unfulfilled plan to destroy German infrastructure, during retreat, to avoid it being used by the Allied forces
