= Ballast cleaner =

Railway track maintenance machine

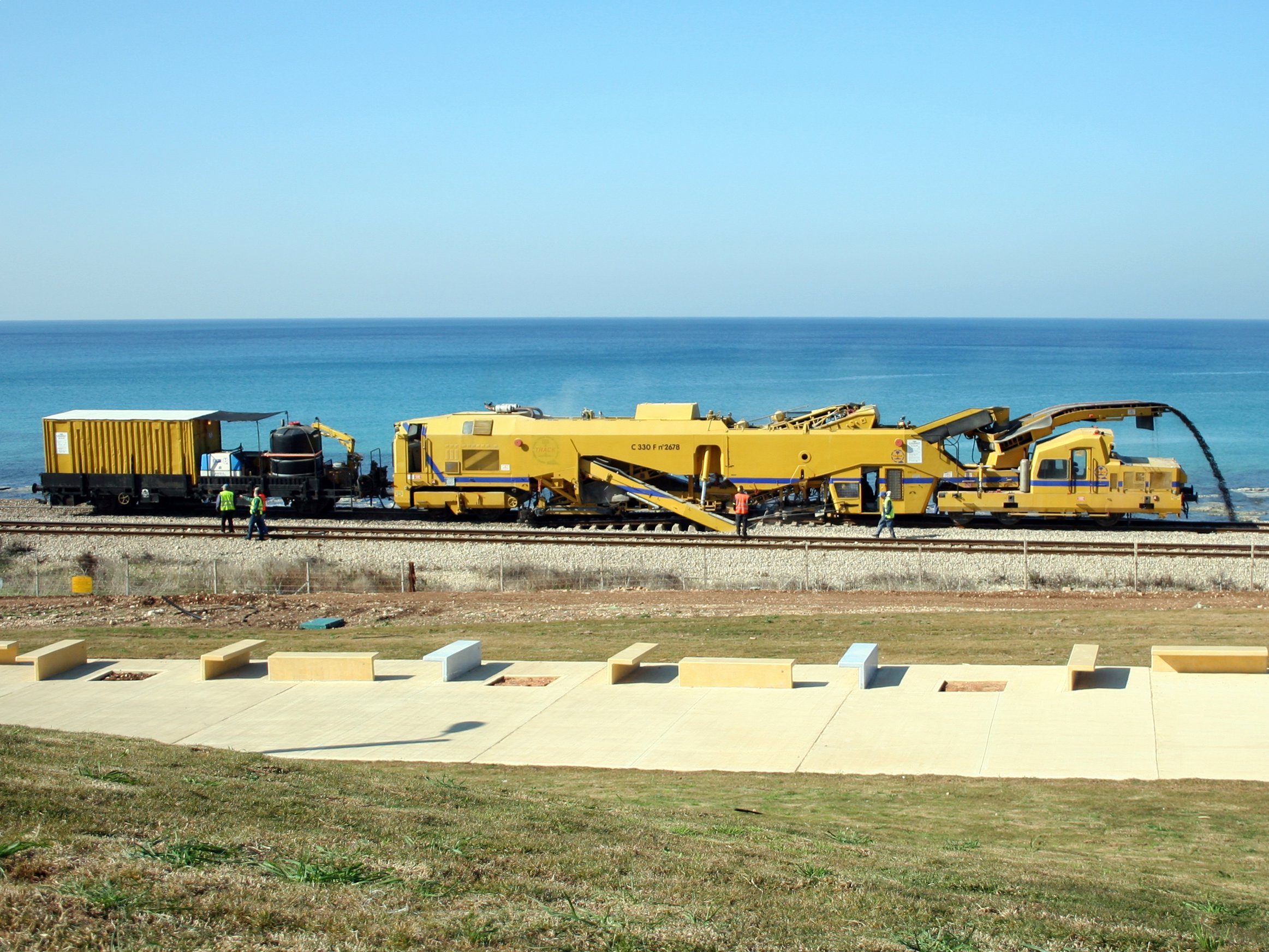
A ballast cleaner Matisa C330F in action on the Coastal Railway in Haifa, Israel.

A ballast cleaner (also known as an undercutter, a shoulder ballast cleaning machine) is a machine that specialises in cleaning the railway track ballast (gravel, blue stone or other aggregate) of impurities.

== Background and development ==
Over time, ballast becomes worn, and loses its angularity, becoming rounded. This hinders the tessellation of pieces of ballast with one another, and thus reduces its effectiveness. Fine pieces of granite, like sand, are also created by attrition, known simply as "fines". Combined with water in the ballast, these fines stick together, making the ballast like a lump of concrete. This hinders both track drainage and the flexibility of the ballast to constrain the track as it moves under traffic. Ballast cleaning removes this worn ballast, screens it and replaces the "dirty" worn ballast with fresh ballast. The advantage of ballast cleaning is that it can be done by an on-track machine without removing the rail and sleepers, and it is therefore cheaper than a total excavation.

In the 19th century and early 20th century, ballast was shoveled or forked, then screened by hand using portable devices. Early automated cleaners used vacuum pressure built by a steam locomotive to suck ballast up from the track to feed it into the sifting grates. Link-Belt produced a small machine that would clean the ballast between tracks on a multiple track line; it used a small gasoline engine and was small enough to be operated by a small crew of men, and it was built such that it would not need to be moved as trains passed on adjacent tracks. More fully automated ballast cleaners were developed in the early- to mid-20th century by several companies including Speno and Pullman-Standard; a version of Pullman-Standard's machine was demonstrated in 1949 that was estimated to save railroad companies about $1,000 per mile of track on their maintenance ($13,531 in 2025). As the century progressed, other manufacturers entered the market with their own versions.

== Modern ballast cleaner operations ==
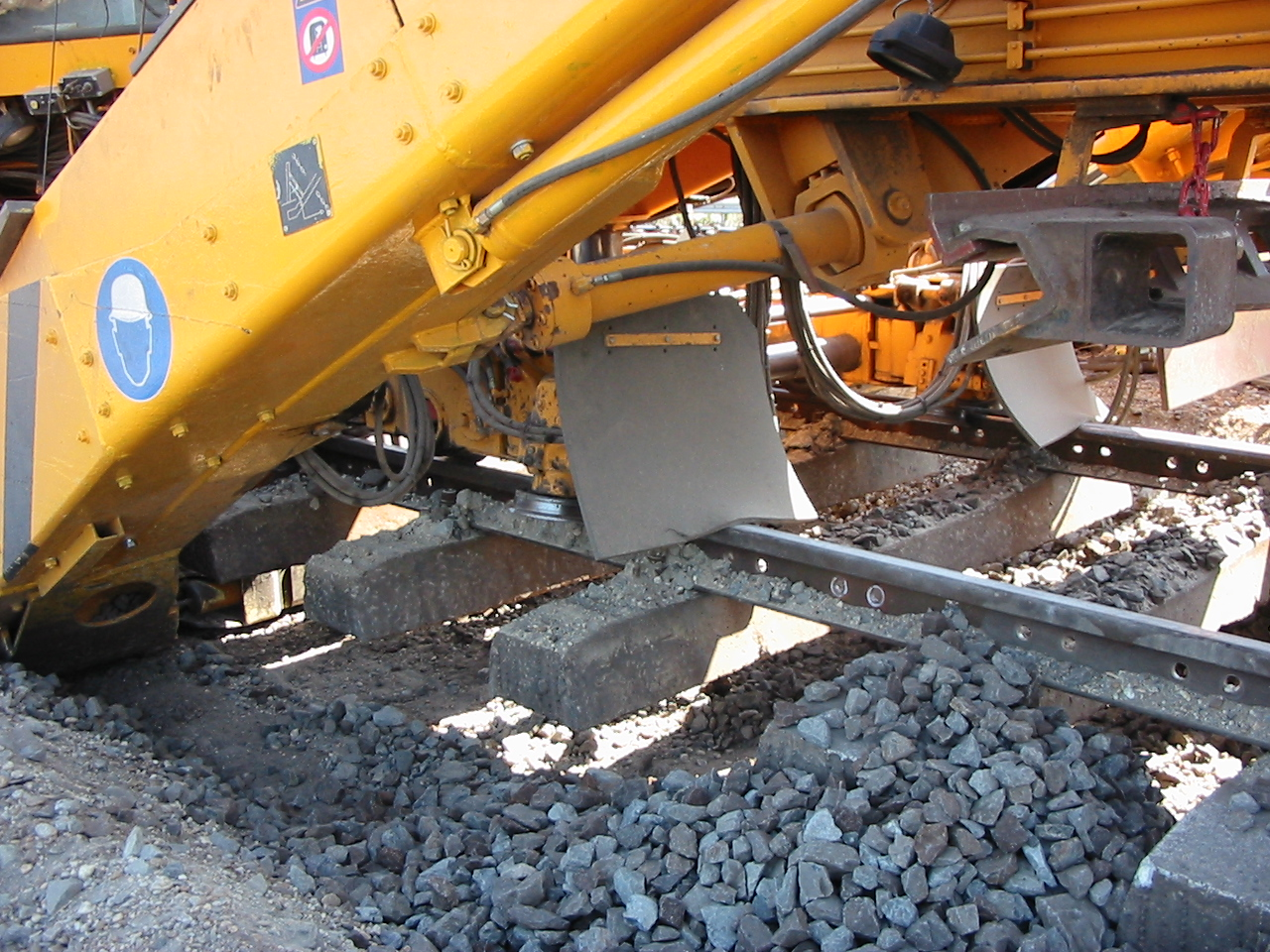
Closeup of the undercutting bar and results on a Plasser & Theurer ballast cleaner in use in Hungary in 2009

A cutter bar runs beneath sleeper level excavating all of the ballast under the sleepers to a specified, variable depth. A conveyor then moves the ballast into the cleaner, where it gets forced through a mesh by a shaking chamber. Pieces of ballast which are smaller than the mesh size fall through and are rejected, those that are bigger than the mesh are returned to the track along with fresh ballast. Some ballast cleaners have both ballast and spoil wagons attached to it, to which the materials are fed by a series of conveyor belts. Others simply undercut the ballast, and allow for a work train to come through to dump fresh ballast. This process can be done in short sections, meaning that track life can be considerably extended with the minimum of disruption.
