= Scale test car =

Type of railroad car in service

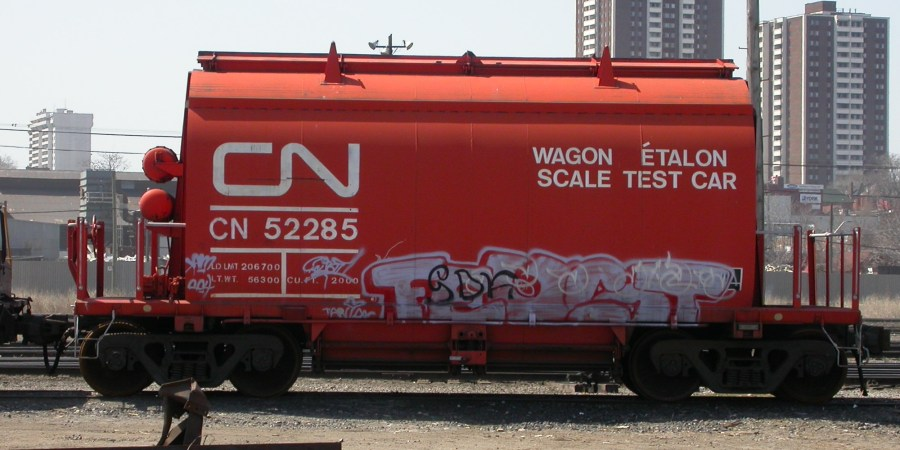
A Canadian scale test car owned by Canadian National

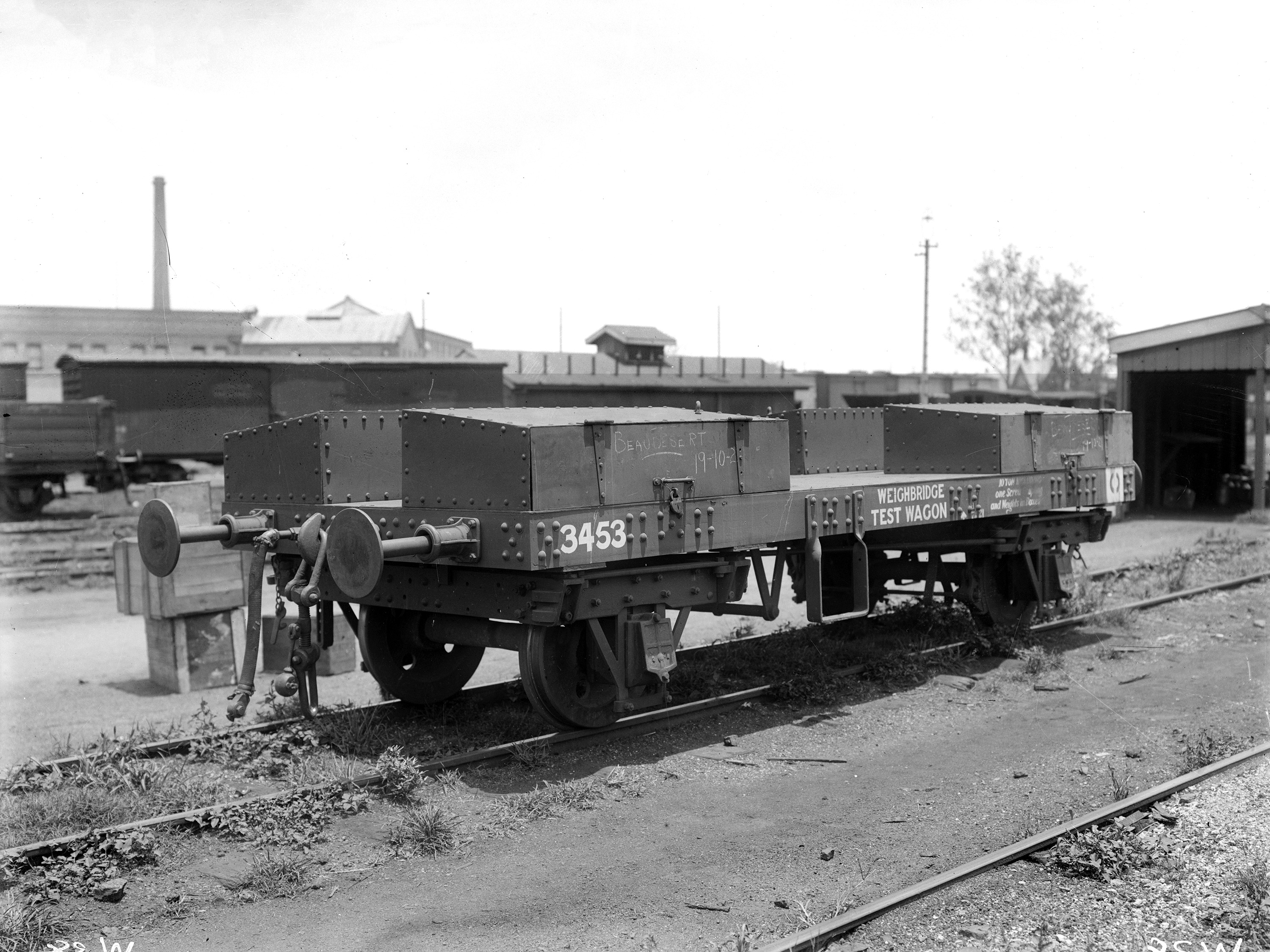
An Australian scale test car

A scale test car is a type of railroad car in maintenance of way service. Its purpose is to calibrate the weighing scales used to weigh loaded railroad cars. Scale test cars are of a precisely known weight so that the track scale can be calibrated against them.

== Purposes ==
Cars are weighed for various purposes. These include:

=== Axle load limits ===
Cars are weighed to ensure they are within the axle load limits of the railroad.

=== Customer billing ===
Cars are weighed to determine (by subtracting the car's unloaded, or tare weight from the total weight) the amount of cargo loaded. This is used to bill the railroad's customers for the carriage of bulk commodities, so it is essential that the track scales be accurate.

== Construction ==
Many scale test cars were small, old railroad cars carrying heavy metal weights as their superstructure. In 1974, in the United States, Benjamin Barnard and Michael Puareia patented a new scale test car design that was self-propelled and could be spotted by a single worker. The cars were first built by the Maxson Corporation and later by Food Machinery Corporation (FMC). Scale test cars need special handling so they will not suffer damage, which might alter their weight. They are reweighed periodically on accurate scales at the railroad's shops.

== See also ==
- Rail weighbridge

== Bibliography ==
- AAR, Engineering Division, "AAR Scale Handbook (2011)"
- USDA, AMS, Grain Inspection Packers and Stockyards Administration (GIPSA), "Weighing Handbook" ch. 3, pp. 31-34, 27 December 2010 (Overall Document dated: April 2014) Retrieved: 08 June 2020
