= Catenary maintenance vehicle =

Railroad vehicle used to maintain and inspect overhead line

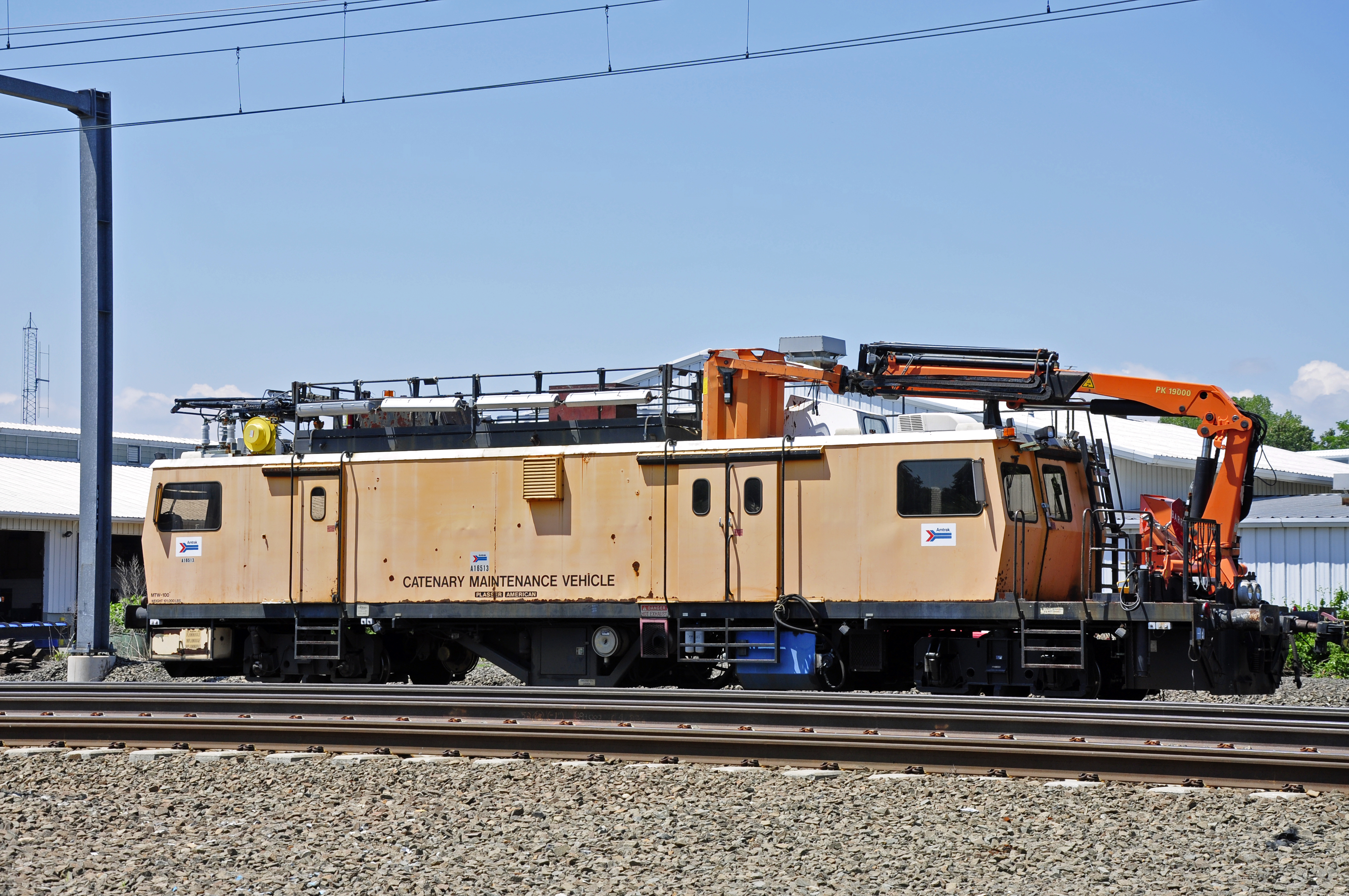
An Amtrak catenary maintenance vehicle. Both a crane and a movable platform can be seen on the vehicle's roof.

A catenary maintenance vehicle (also known as a tower wagon or tower car) is a railroad maintenance of way vehicle that is used to maintain and inspect overhead line (also known as catenary) on electrified railroad or metro tracks. Such vehicles are typically self-propelled by a diesel engine, to allow them to operate when power is shut off to the overhead lines for worker safety or in the event of a power failure. Catenary maintenance vehicles allow maintenance of way workers to safely work on overhead wires and typically include a crane to install or remove wires as needed.

== Design ==
Railroad overhead lines must be suspended high enough to allow a sufficient loading gauge for trains to travel beneath them safely. This means they are suspended too high for workers to reach by hand. Additionally, a specialized vehicle is required to minimize the risk of electric shock when working with overhead wires which are operated at voltages which can be fatal to humans. A catenary maintenance vehicle must allow maintenance of way workers to safely access the catenary and facilitate repair, inspection, and replacement of wires as needed. A typical catenary maintenance vehicle has two features used to access the catenary: a crane, and a top-mounted platform which can be raised to access the catenary, and lowered when not in use to reduce the vehicle's height. This platform can accommodate several workers, and in some vehicles is also capable of rotation. Many also include a grounded pantograph that, when raised, grounds the overhead line for additional protection.

To assist workers in their duties, catenary maintenance vehicles normally include an interior workshop and storage space, along with basic crew amenities such as bathrooms and a kitchen.

Many catenary maintenance vehicles also are capable of towing other vehicles, which can be used to rescue stalled trains or carry additional maintenance of way equipment such as flatcars to carry supplies like wires.

For inspection purposes, modern catenary maintenance vehicles often include computers and software that can analyze and store data on catenary conditions. Amtrak's Plasser MTW 100 Catenary Inspection and Maintenance Car includes a catenary wire measuring system which is capable of storing data on catenary conditions for up to 100 miles of track.

In addition to the typical rail based vehicles, some manufacturers also offer road–rail vehicles equipped with lifts and/or cranes to perform the same tasks on a smaller and more flexible platform.

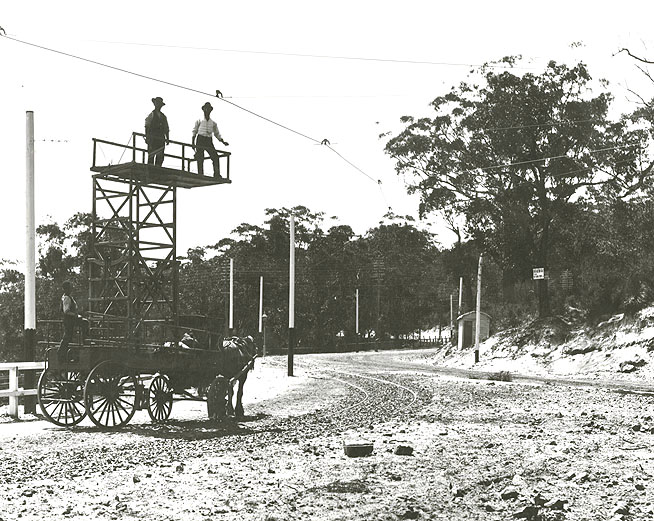
A very early form of a catenary maintenance vehicle/tower wagon - in this case, a horse-drawn cart with a platform on top.

== Operation ==
To provide the least conflict with train movements, catenary maintenance vehicles typically operate at night when fewer trains are in operation.

While catenary maintenance vehicles normally conduct planned inspections and repairs, they are vital in the event of damage or disruption to the overhead wires that provide power to electric trains. In the event of a failure, one or more catenary maintenance vehicles will be dispatched for emergency repairs.

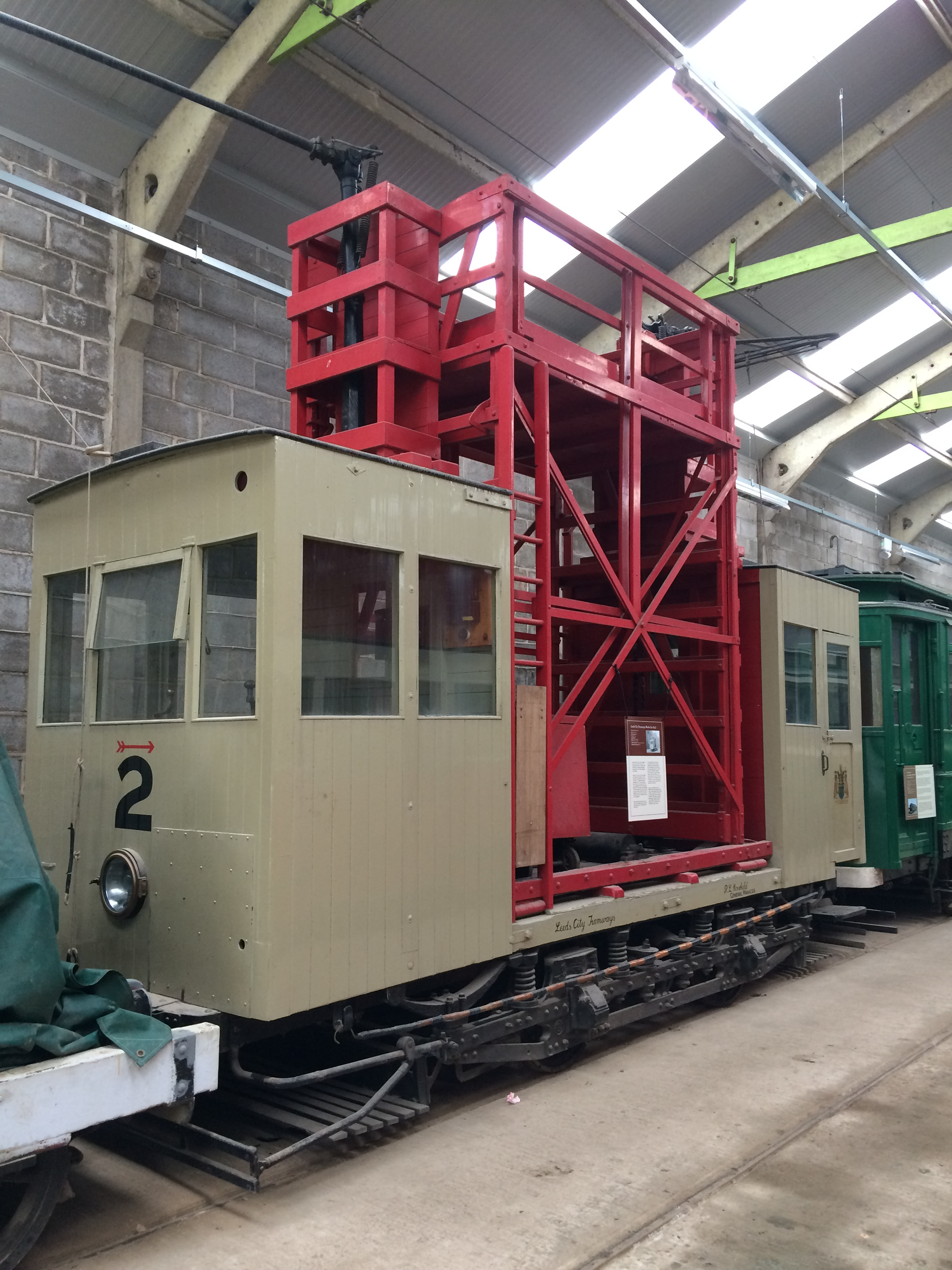
A tram version of a catenary maintenance vehicle, known in the United Kingdom as a tower wagon.

While primarily designed for working with overhead wires, these vehicles can also be used to inspect bridges and tunnels along the railroad. Amtrak uses catenary maintenance vehicles for its "Ice Patrol" that clears ice and icicles from the wires in the rail tunnels in and around New York City.

== Manufacturers ==
- Tesmec
- Plasser & Theurer
- Arva Industries
- Hokuriku Heavy Industries
- Transputmash
- Harsco
- Zweihoff
