= Crew car =

Type of passenger railroad car

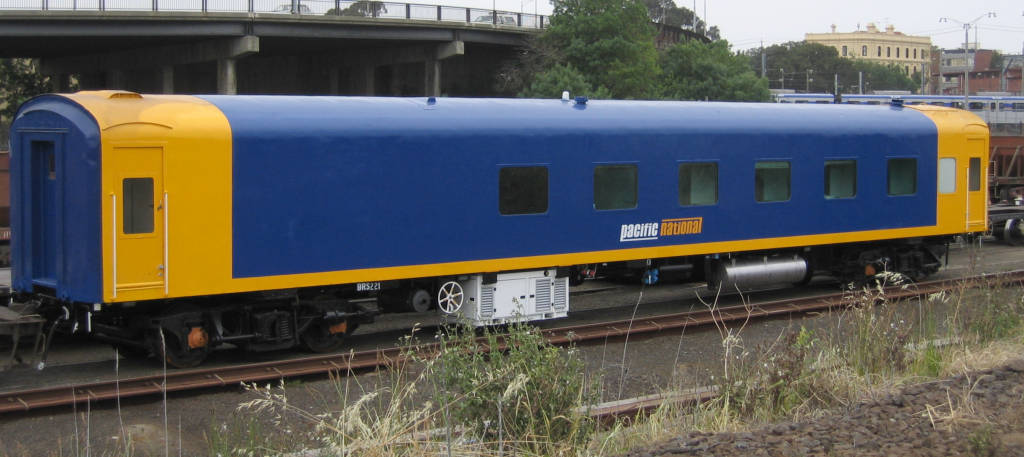
A former Victorian Railways passenger car converted into a crew car, owned by Pacific National.

A crew car (also known as a relay van) is a passenger carriage specially fitted out for the use of train drivers. Interior fittings include a sleeping compartment for each crew member, a lounge area, a kitchen, a bathroom, and laundry. They are usually provided with an onboard generator system and air conditioning. The practice is also known as Relay Working.

== Background ==
They are used mainly on long-distance Intermodal freight trains in Australia and grain trains that travel with two crews who alternate crewing the train on duty / off duty during the journey. The car is usually marshalled directly or a few carriages behind the locomotives. Most crew cars have been converted from older SAR, VR and NSWGR passenger cars or depowered SAR Bluebird Railcars.

Major Australian users of crew cars include One Rail Australia, Aurizon, Pacific National, and SCT Logistics, predominantly found on routes between Adelaide, Darwin and Perth. In 2023, Aurizon commenced relay work in Victoria on Intermodal services to Perth using Adelaide based drivers.

== See also ==
- Caboose
- Crew rest compartment
- Troop kitchen
