= Rail ambulance =

Medical transport railway vehicle

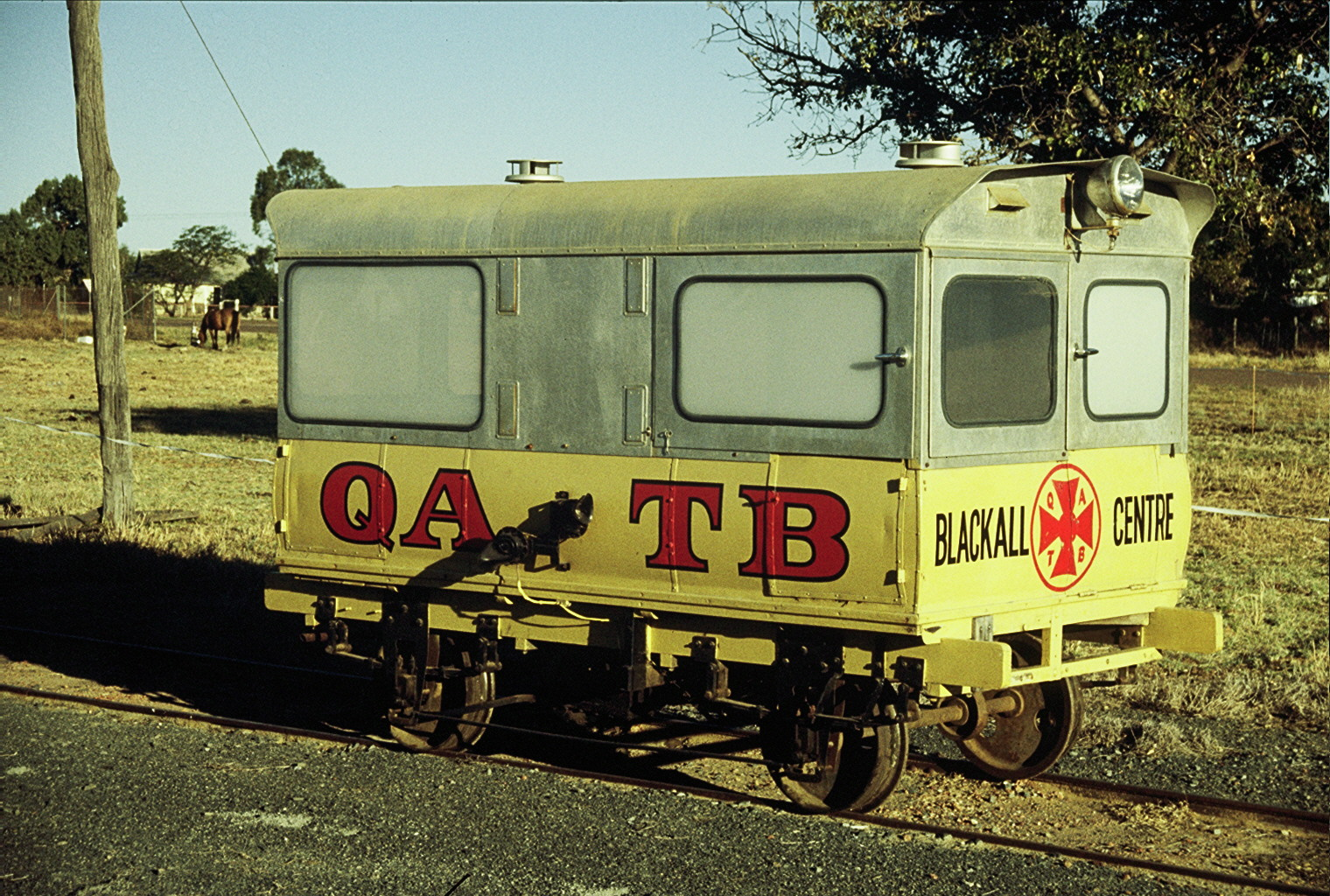
Blackall rail ambulance, September 1989

A rail ambulance is a vehicle used for medical transportation services on railway lines. The first rail ambulance in Queensland, Australia, was introduced in 1918, with the last withdrawn from service around 1990.

The rail ambulance was usually a specially equipped petrol engined rail inspection trolley, funded by a local community, with a railway employee volunteering to drive it when necessary. The initials QATB stand for Queensland Ambulance Transport Brigade.

== History ==
Queensland is a vast, relatively unpopulated area, where providing services to remote communities in a cost-effective way has been a continual challenge. Railways were built from 1865, and in many areas provided the major form of transport until a significant road improvement program was commenced by the Queensland government from the 1960s.

It was in this context that the mining community of Blair Athol introduced the first rail ambulance in 1918, in order to enable injured people to be transported to the nearest hospital at Clermont.

The idea rapidly spread, with rail ambulances being introduced at Dalby (1919), Mount Mulligan (1920), Roma and Charleville (1922), Goondiwindi and Baralaba (1923), Cloncurry (1925) and Blackall (1941). Other towns known to have had a rail ambulance at some stage include Charters Towers, Pentland, Atherton, Ravenshoe and Millaa Millaa.

The last rail ambulances were withdrawn in 1990 from Mareeba and Blackall, as by that stage road ambulance services were available through the State.

== See also ==
- Hospital train
- Railway surgery
