= Work train =

Rail infrastructure maintenance unit

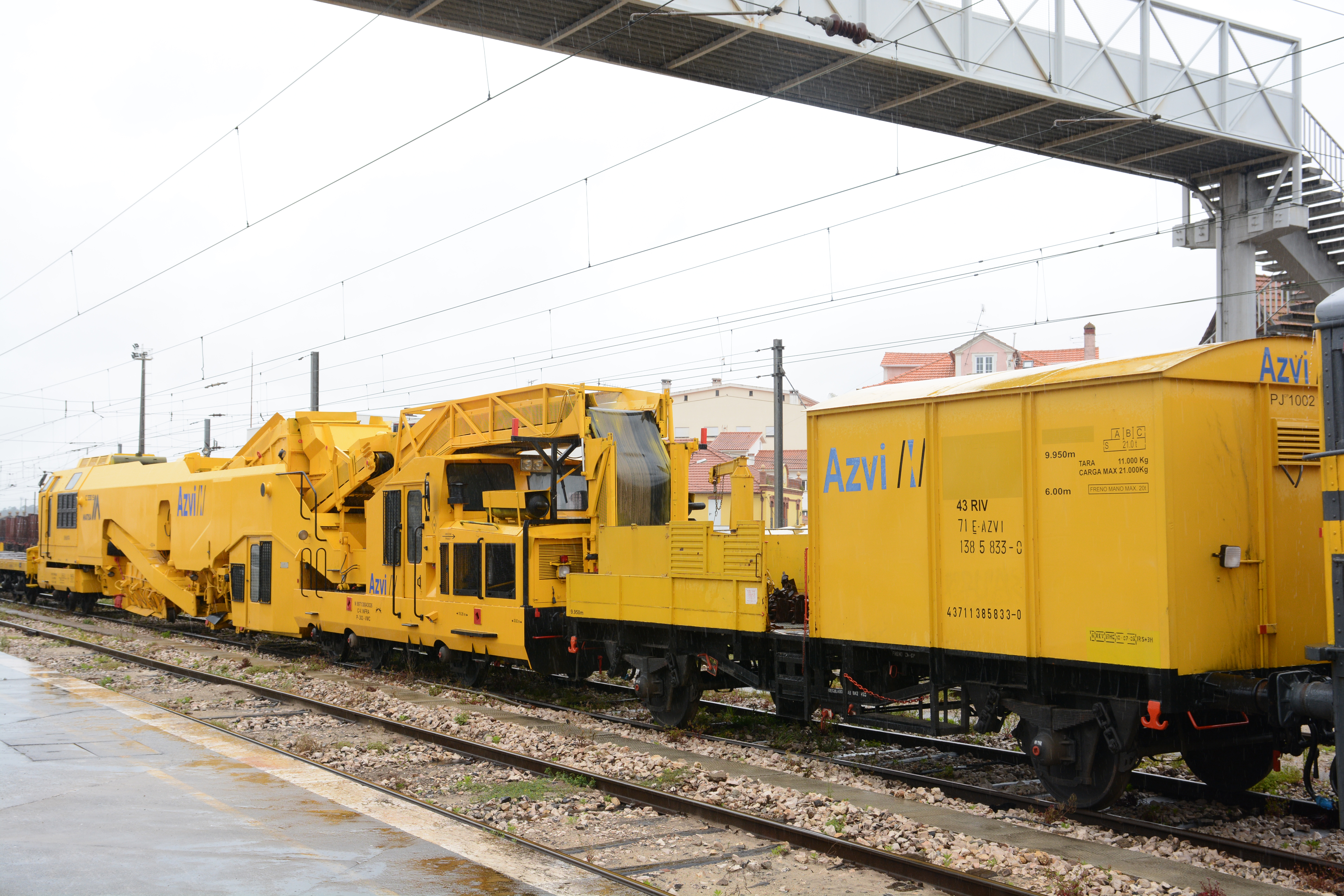
A maintenance of way train in Spain, in 2016.

A work train (departmental train or engineering train/vehicles in the UK) is one or more rail cars intended for internal non-revenue use by the railroad's operator. Work trains serve functions such as track maintenance, maintenance of way, revenue collection, system cleanup and waste removal, heavy duty hauling, and crew member transport.

== Types of equipment ==
=== Track inspection ===
Several railroad vehicles are used to inspect tracks and infrastructure, identifying flaws and areas that need routine maintenance.

- Rail inspection cars and Sperry rail cars - Inspects tracks for flaws and defects.
- Rail bridge inspection - Rail vehicles that have specialized equipment, such as Aerial work platforms to enable access to the bridge.
- Dynamometer cars - Rail car that measures locomotive performance, such as traction effort, speed, etc.
- Track geometry cars - Rail car that collects information on track properties, such as banking of curves, grade, etc.
- Scale test cars - Rail car that is built to be an exact weight, used to test railroad car scales for accuracy.
- hi-rail trucks/SUVs - Road vehicles that can also be driven onto train tracks.

=== Track maintenance and renewal ===
Track maintenance and renewal trains often consist of many separate pieces of equipment, each capable of servicing specific track components.

- Ballast regulators - Distributes ballast to a desired shape and position.
- Ballast tampers - Tamps or levels and compacts ballast to make the trackbed more secure.
- Ballast cleaners - Collects and cleans ballast to prolong its life and improve drainage by removing debris.
- Cranes - Rail mounted cranes.
- Ballast hopper - A specialized hopper car that is designed to spread ballast between rails and to the sides of rails, and to control ballast flow.
- Rail grinders - Uses grinding wheels to restore rails to an ideal shape, extending the lifetime of the rail.
- Spreaders - Rail-based plow that is used to move ballast and create ditches beside train tracks.
- Side dump cars - Rail car that was built so that it can dump its load, often ballast, to the side, at any location.
- Spike puller - Pulls out spikes from railroad ties.
- Spike driver - Inserts new spikes into railroad ties.
- Tie exchanger - Removes and inserts railroad ties from under rails that are already in place.
- Continuous welded rail trains - Specially modified flatcars for carrying long sections of continuously welded rail for installation, often accompanied by flatcars with equipment for welding sections of rail together.
- Track renewal train - A train capable of doing multiple tasks to replace multiple track components (ties, rails, spikes, etc).

=== Snow removal ===
Trains are susceptible to issues related to low rail traction as well as being immobilized by significant snowfalls.

- Wedge plows - A simple V-shaped plow, pushed by one or more locomotives.
- Flanger - A railcar that removes snow and ice from between rails.
- Spreaders - Spreaders can also be used for snow removal, offering more control over where the snow can be directed.
- Snow blower - A machine that uses augers or impellers to throw the snow clear of tracks.
- Rotary snowplows - A type of snow blower that uses massive rotating blades to cut through and throw snow clear of tracks.
- De-icer cars - Rail cars that use chemicals or heat to melt snow and ice on tracks.
- Rail adhesion cars - Rail cars that are used to address areas of low rail traction.

=== Vegetation control ===
The uncontrolled growth of weeds and other vegetation along railroad right-of-ways can cause significant drainage issues, obstruct worker access, and become a nuisance to adjacent property owners.

- Weed spraying trains - Trains that deploy weed killer to control the growth of weeds on railroad tracks and ditches along tracks.
- Bush cutters - Used to cut weeds and other vegetation from railroad tracks and ditches along tracks, using blades or saws.

=== Other railroad cars ===
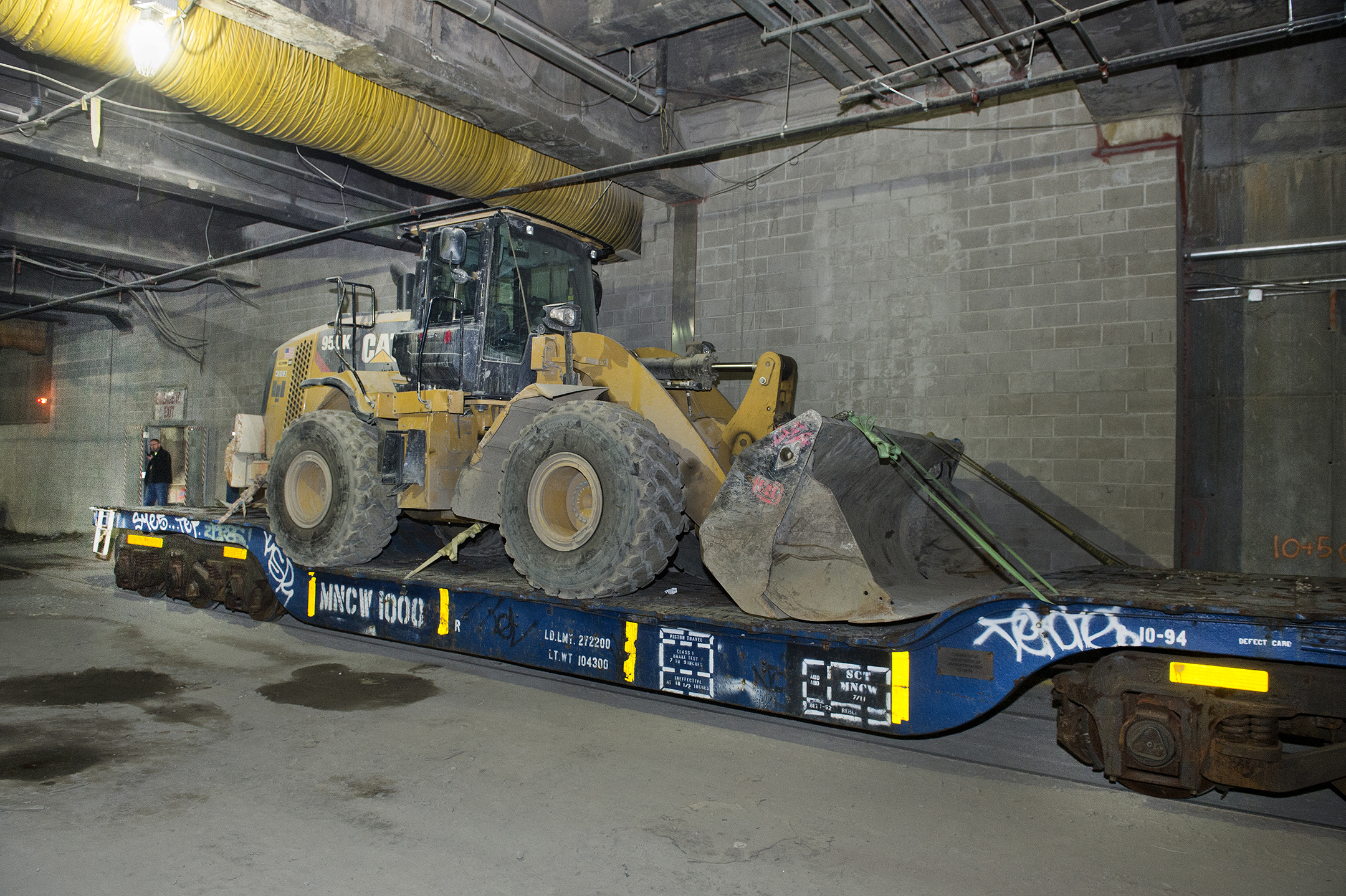
A front-end loader on a Metro-North Railroad (MNCW) flatcar for the East Side Access project.

In addition to specialized equipment above, most railroads have allocated regular rail cars and locomotives to railroad maintenance duties. This is often older equipment that has either reached the age limit that prohibits it from interchange with other railroad, and is required to stay on the railroad that owns it, or equipment that has been rendered obsolete by newer, often higher capacity versions: tank cars, flatcars, hoppers, gondola, boxcars as well as locomotives.

Railroads have historically kept rail-mounted cranes of various sizes to assist with maintenance work and major construction projects, and to respond to derailments and natural disasters. These have in large part been displaced by a mixture of road-biased mobile cranes and sideboom bulldozers.

Beyond typical railroad cars, hi-rail technology has allowed railroads to put conventional heavy equipment such as excavators, mobile cranes, bucket trucks, concrete mixers, etc, right onto the tracks.

=== Subways and metros ===
In addition to the equipment listed above, subways often have specialized equipment designed to address unique issues within subway systems, such as the difficulty of removing trash from underground stations.

- Trash collection trains - Trains that visit stations to remove trash.
- Revenue collection cars - Trains that visit stations to collect money collected from turnstiles and ticket sales.
- Vacuum cars - A rail car that vacuums up litter and dropped objects from the tracks, as they accumulate in the closed environment of a subway tunnel.
- Flood cleanup cars (reach cars, pump cars, hose cars) - Trains deployed to remove water following tunnel flooding.

== Gallery ==
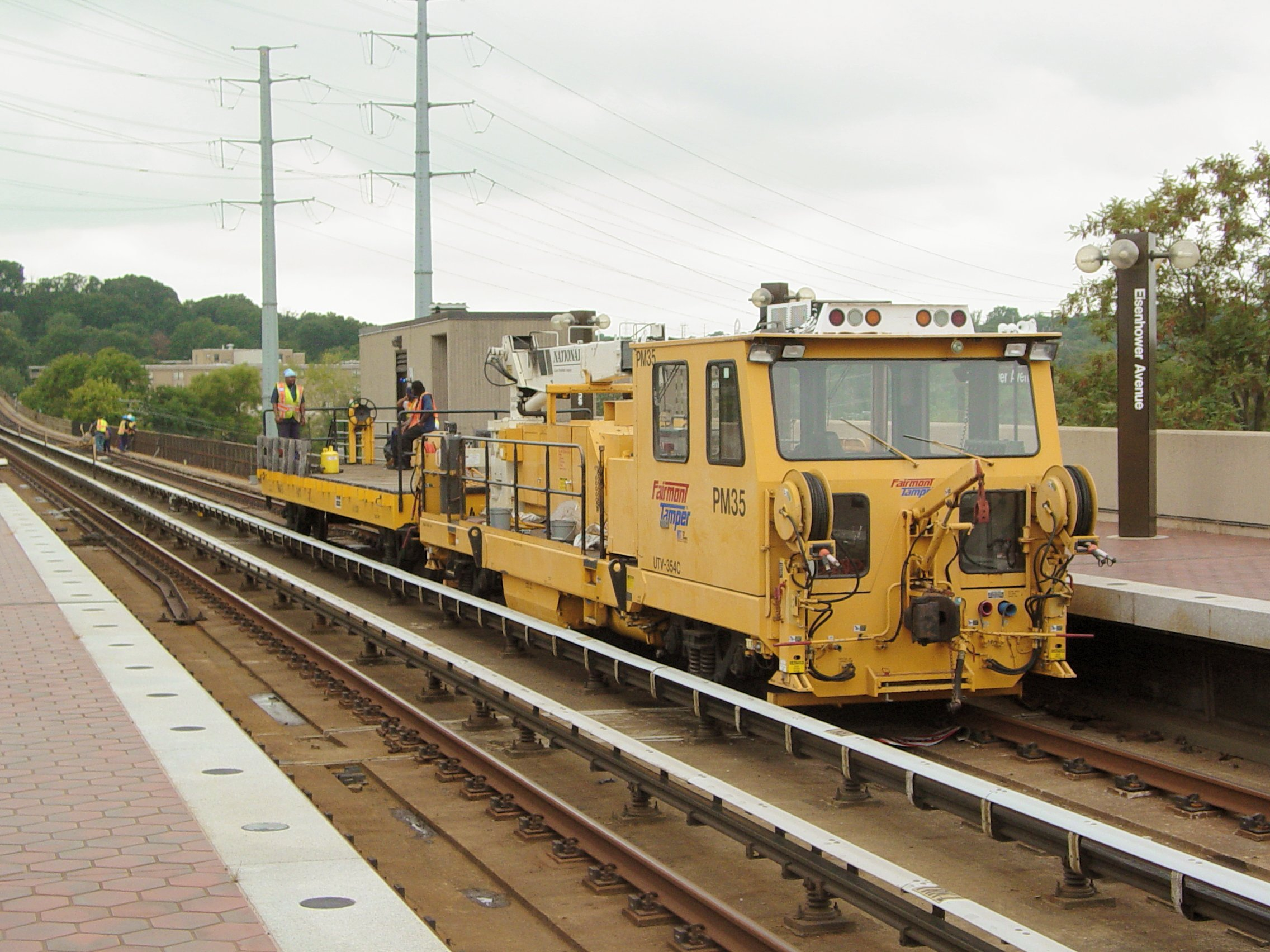
A Washington Metro work car in Virginia providing support for a track maintenance operation

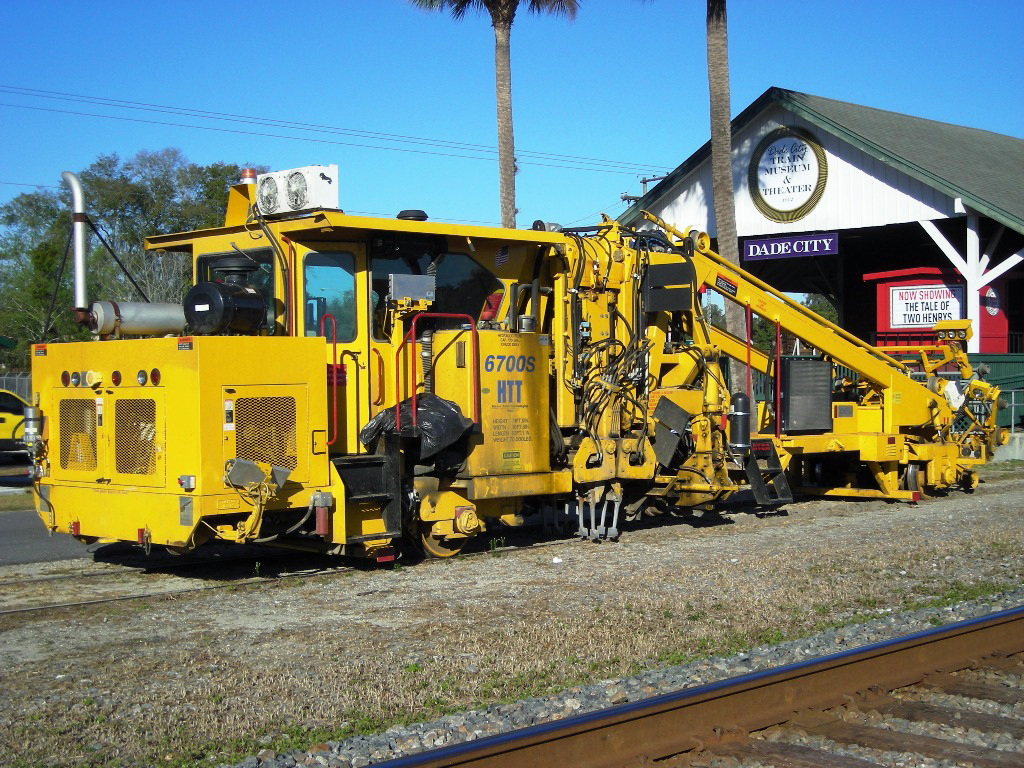
Ballast tamping machine as used in railroad track maintenance in Florida

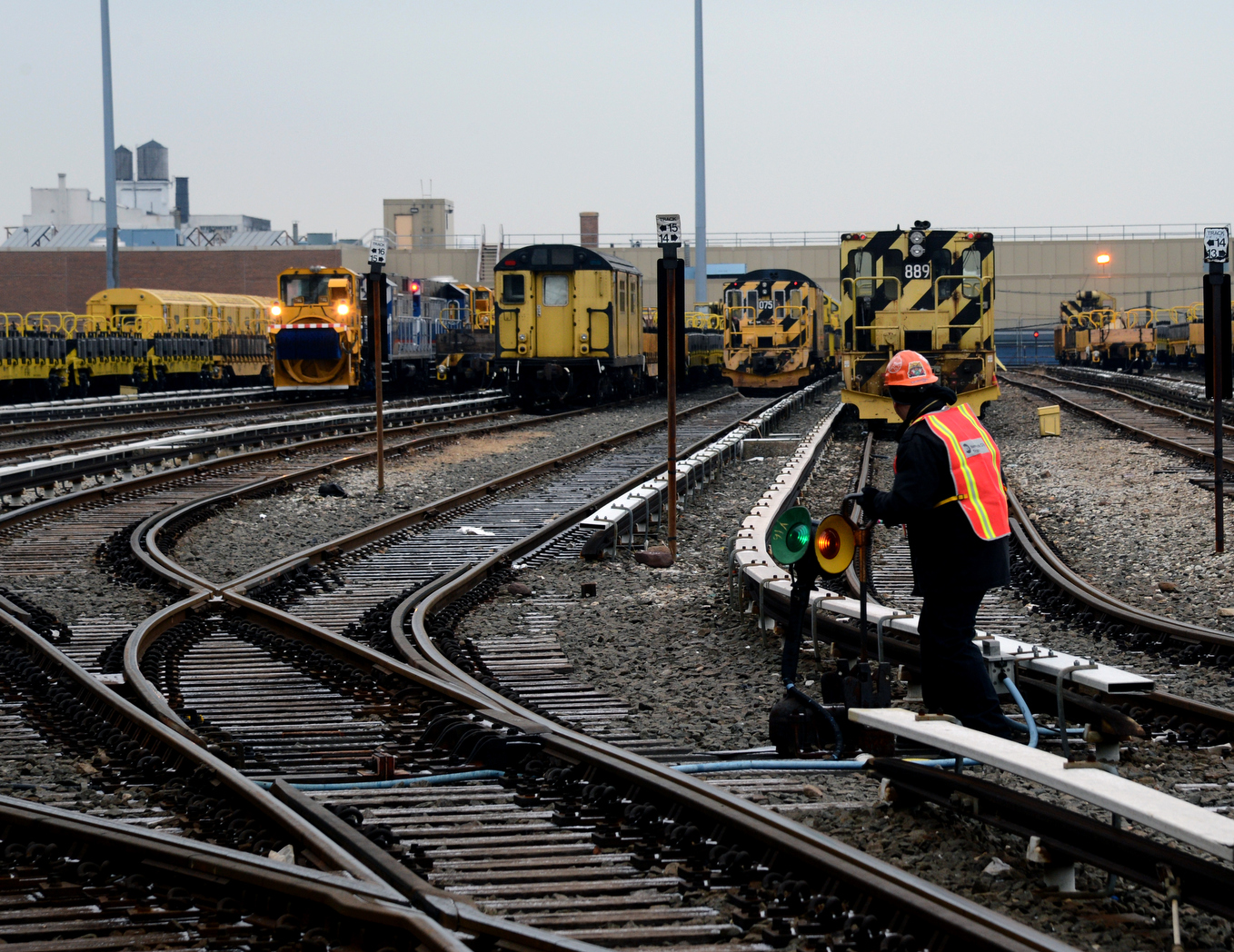
Various New York Subway work trains at Brooklyn's 38th Street Yard

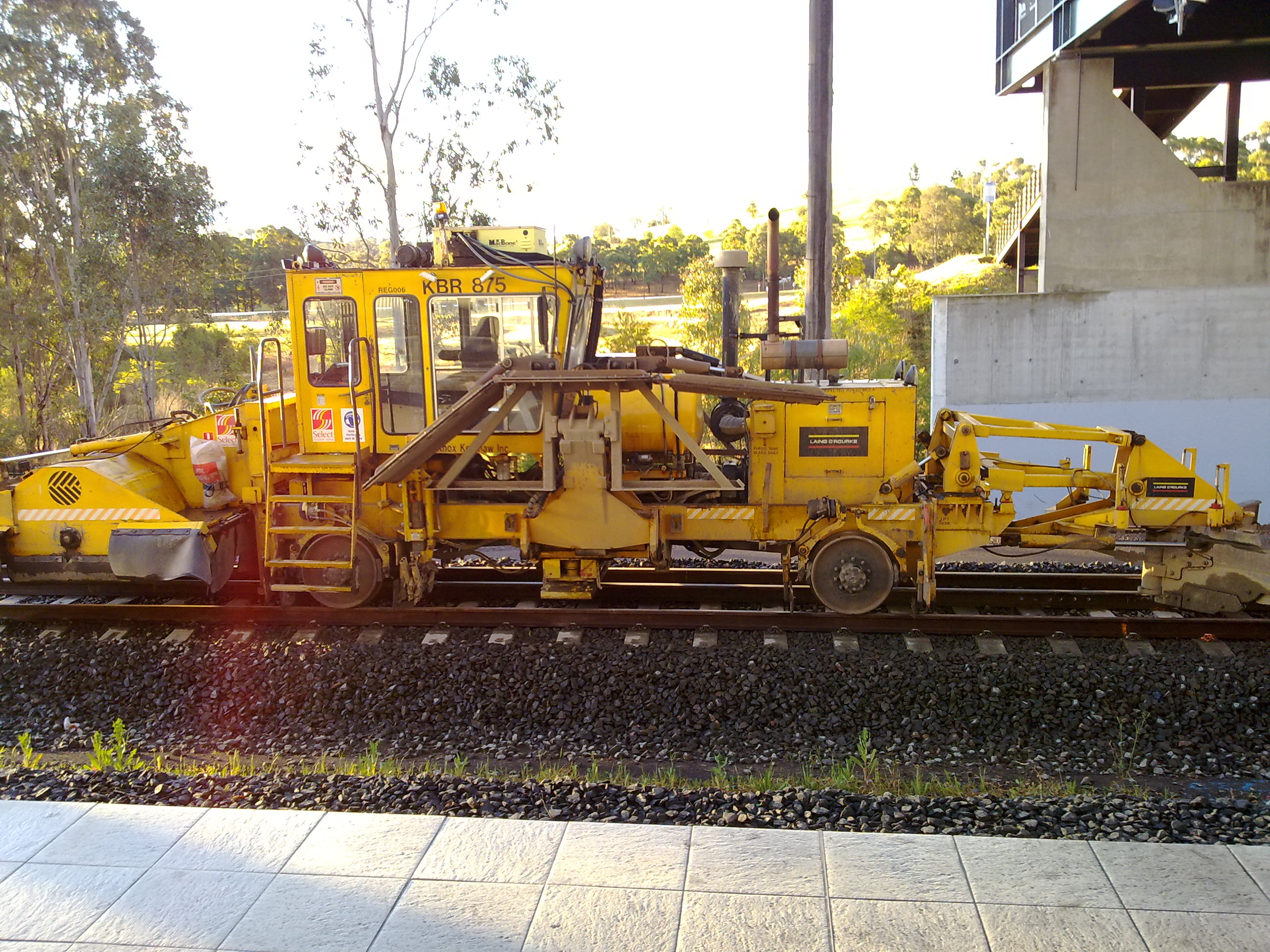
Work train at the construction of a freight line in Sydney, Australia

== See also ==
- List of railway vehicles
- Non-revenue cars
- Plasser & Theurer
- Rail inspection
- Track renewal train
