= Spike puller =

Machine used to remove rail spikes

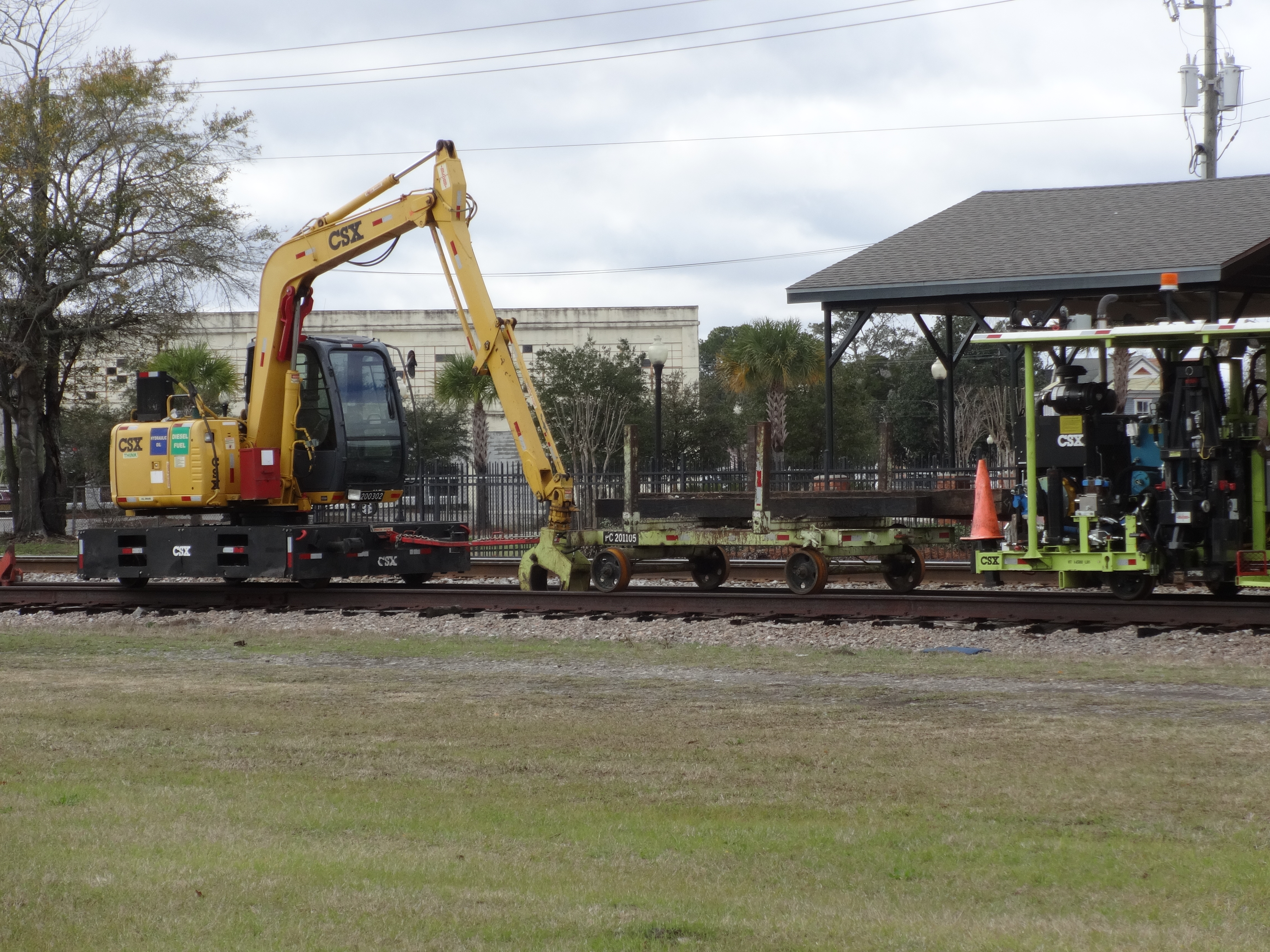
A spike puller can be seen on the right side of this image.

A spike puller is a railroad maintenance of way machine designed to remove rail spikes from ties. The spike puller automates the task of spike removal, allowing it to be done at a rate greater than can be achieved by hand. Spike pullers range from small hand operated hydraulic machines to self propelled machines controlled by an operator in an enclosed cab.

== History ==
Traditionally, spikes were pulled by hand with spike mauls, which act similar to the claw on a claw hammer on a larger scale. This task was labor-intensive and slow, requiring multiple track workers to be done in a reasonable amount of time. For small-scale jobs, spikes may still be removed by hand today, but larger projects will instead use mechanized spike pullers. By using hydraulic force and pulling directly upwards, spike pullers are both faster and more powerful than a worker with a spike maul, and extract spikes vertically to avoid damaging them, to allow them to be reused.

Spikes must be removed before the rails or ties can be replaced, as the spikes hold them together. Spike pullers will often work with other machines such as tie extractor/inserters and spike drivers as part of a section crew.

== Design ==
=== Self-propelled spike pullers ===
Spike pullers are self-propelled by a diesel engine and travel along the railroad tracks. A typical spike puller is a small, two axle machine. Most spike pullers are designed only to remove spikes on one side of the tracks, meaning that two machines must be used together to remove all the spikes from both rails. Some larger spike pullers are designed to pull spikes on both rails at the same time, these are known as two rail or dual spike pullers.

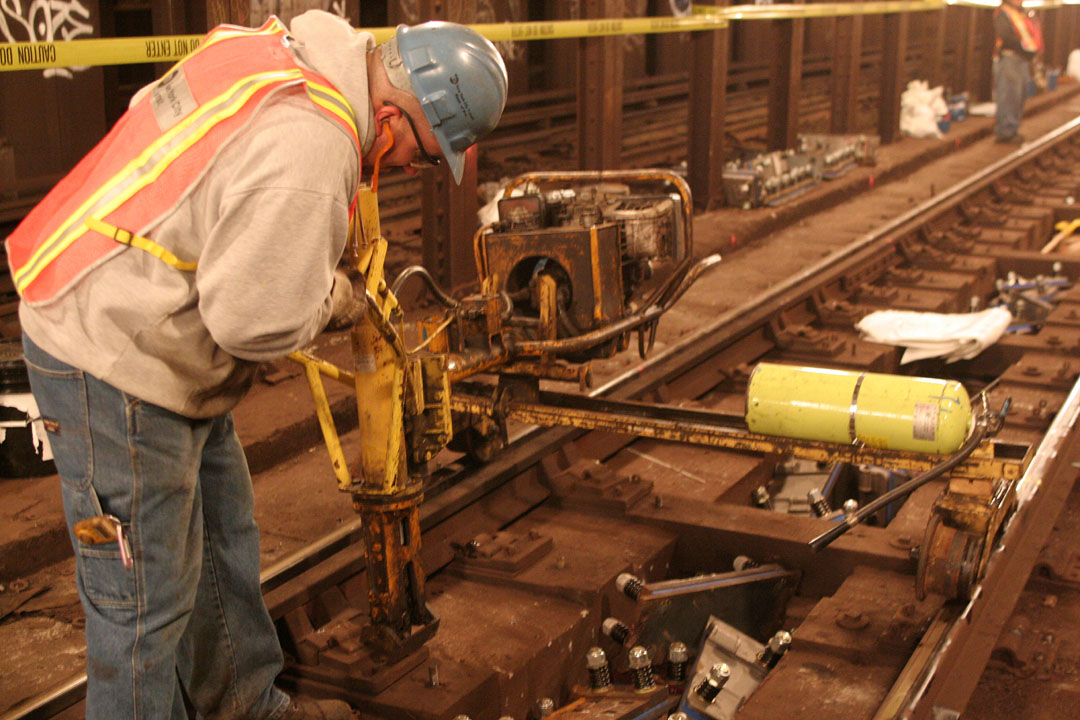
A Metropolitan Transportation Authority worker uses a motorized hand operated spike puller.

=== Hand-operated spike pullers ===
When not very many spikes need to be removed, or where there is not enough clearance for a self-propelled spike puller, smaller and cheaper manually operated spike pullers may be used. These may ride along the tracks on wheels, or may be small and light enough to be carried and moved by hand.

== Method of operation ==
A spike puller uses one or more claws to grab under the head of a spike and pull it from the tracks. The spike will then be deposited trackside for later collection, either to be reused or scrapped. At its most basic, a spike puller will only have one claw which can be moved to either side of the rail to pull spikes. Most modern spike pullers instead have two claws placed on either side of the rail, allowing for two spikes to be pulled at once. Two rail spike pullers expand this to up to 4 spikes at once.

== Manufacturers ==
- Harsco
- Nordco
- Swingmaster
- Stanley Black & Decker
- Geismar (company)

== See also ==
- Spike driver, a machine that performs the opposite task (inserting spikes).
- Rail fastening system
