= Maintenance of way =

Aspect of rail transport operations

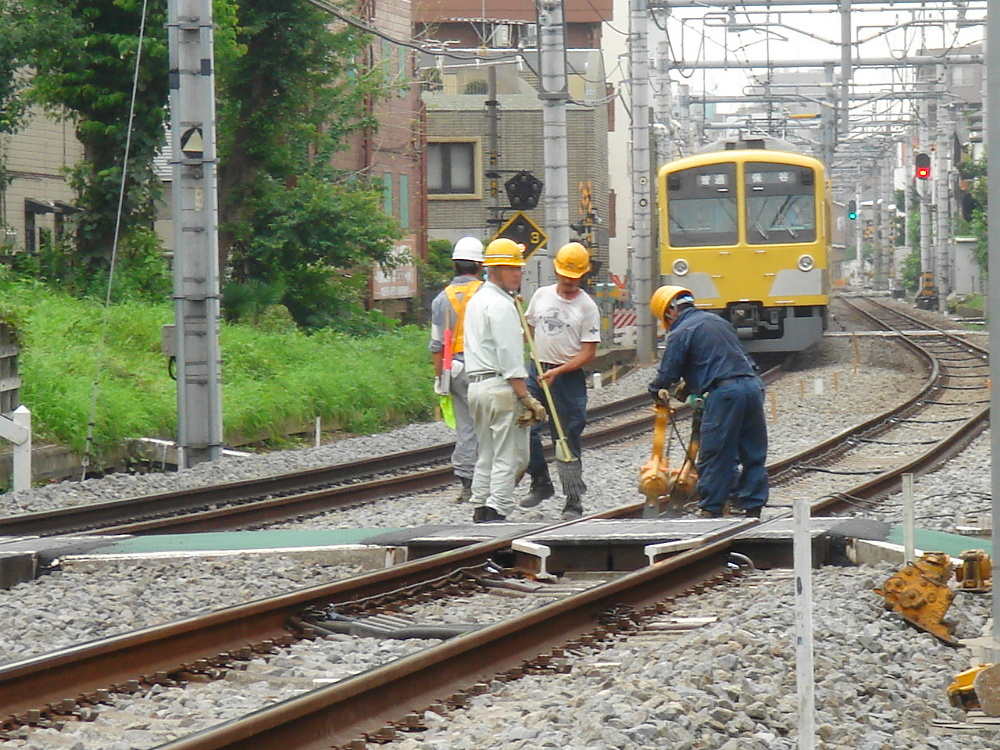
Maintenance of way workers repairing track in Japan

Maintenance of way (commonly abbreviated to MOW, also known as "Permanent Way Maintenance" or "PWM" in Britain) refers to the maintenance, construction, and improvement of rail infrastructure, including tracks, ballast, grade, and lineside infrastructure such as signals and signs.

== Track ==
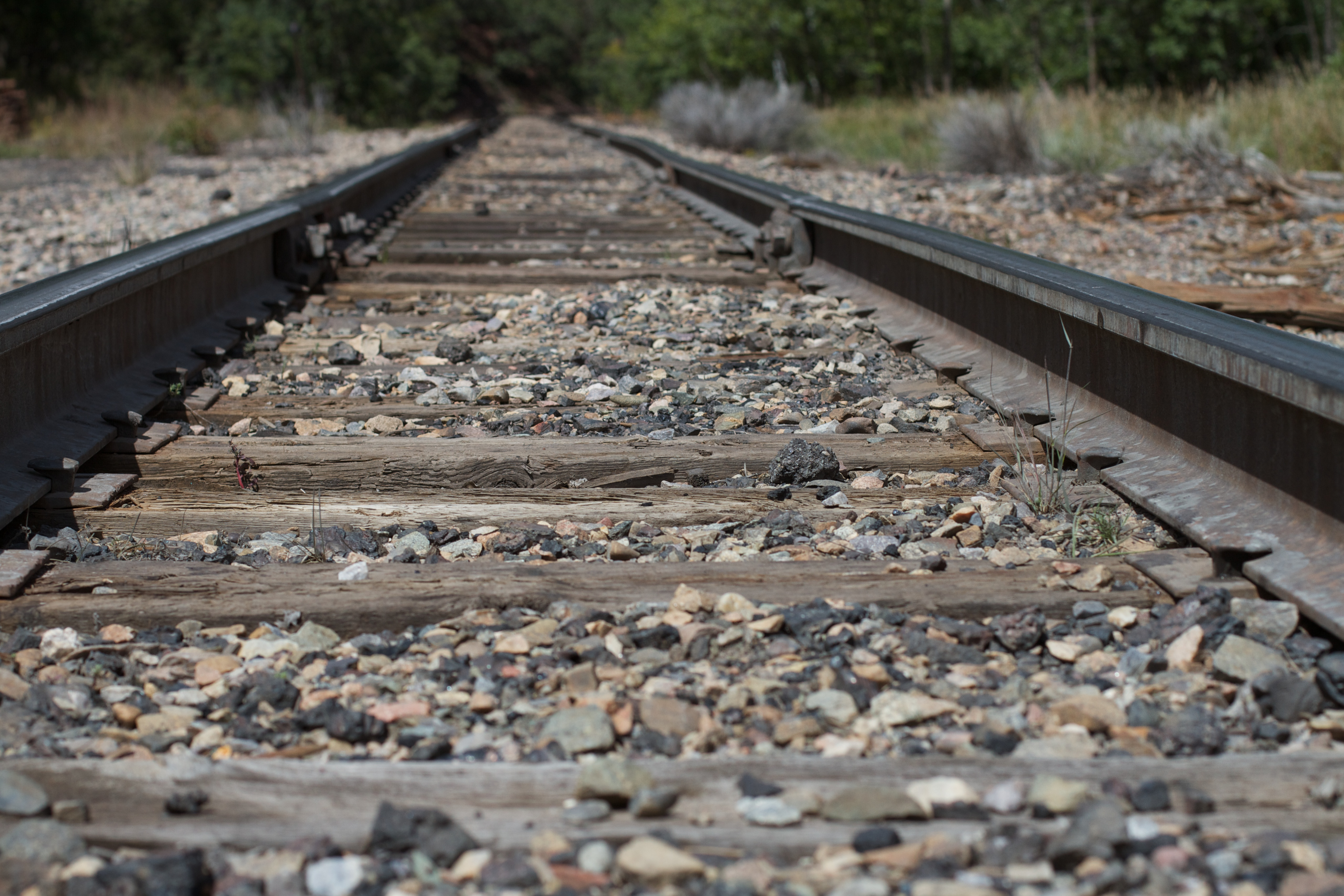
A section of jointed rail, on wooden ties, with spikes to secure the rails.

Railroad tracks consist of multiple key components: a track bed, and ballast forming the foundation of the tracks. Then the tracks themselves are place on the ballast, the tracks consist of a railroad tie, fasteners to secure the rails to the ties, such as spikes or clips, rails, which are assembled on a bed of ballast, which is in turn on a track bed that supports it all.

Ballast is a material used to support the ties and rails, and keep them in place. It is also a key part of drainage along railway lines to ensure the integrity of the tracks during rain and other wet weather. Ballast is often a crushed stone. Stones need to be irregularly shaped, in order to increase friction that holds the tracks in place.

Railroad ties can be made of a number of materials: wood, concrete, steel. Wood is one of the older materials used, and is common for its simplicity and usability in most situations, as well as ease of connecting to rails. Concrete ties are desirable on high speed routes, as well as those dealing with unusually heavy trains, such as the Powder River Basin's coal trains. In some situations, such as the Gotthard Base Tunnel rails are affixed directly to concrete, eliminating the need for individual ties and the ballast that supports them.

Rails in use today are made of steel, formed into their final shape while still hot. Rails are frequently measured in weight per yard, such as 135 pounds (61 kg) per yard (0.91 m). Through the mid to late 20th century, rails were typically bolted together, this has given way to continuously welded rails that have fewer joints.

Rails are secured to the ties using a fastener. With wood ties, spikes are commonly used. Concrete ties are unable to use spikes, and use other styles of fasteners, like clips.

== Track inspection ==
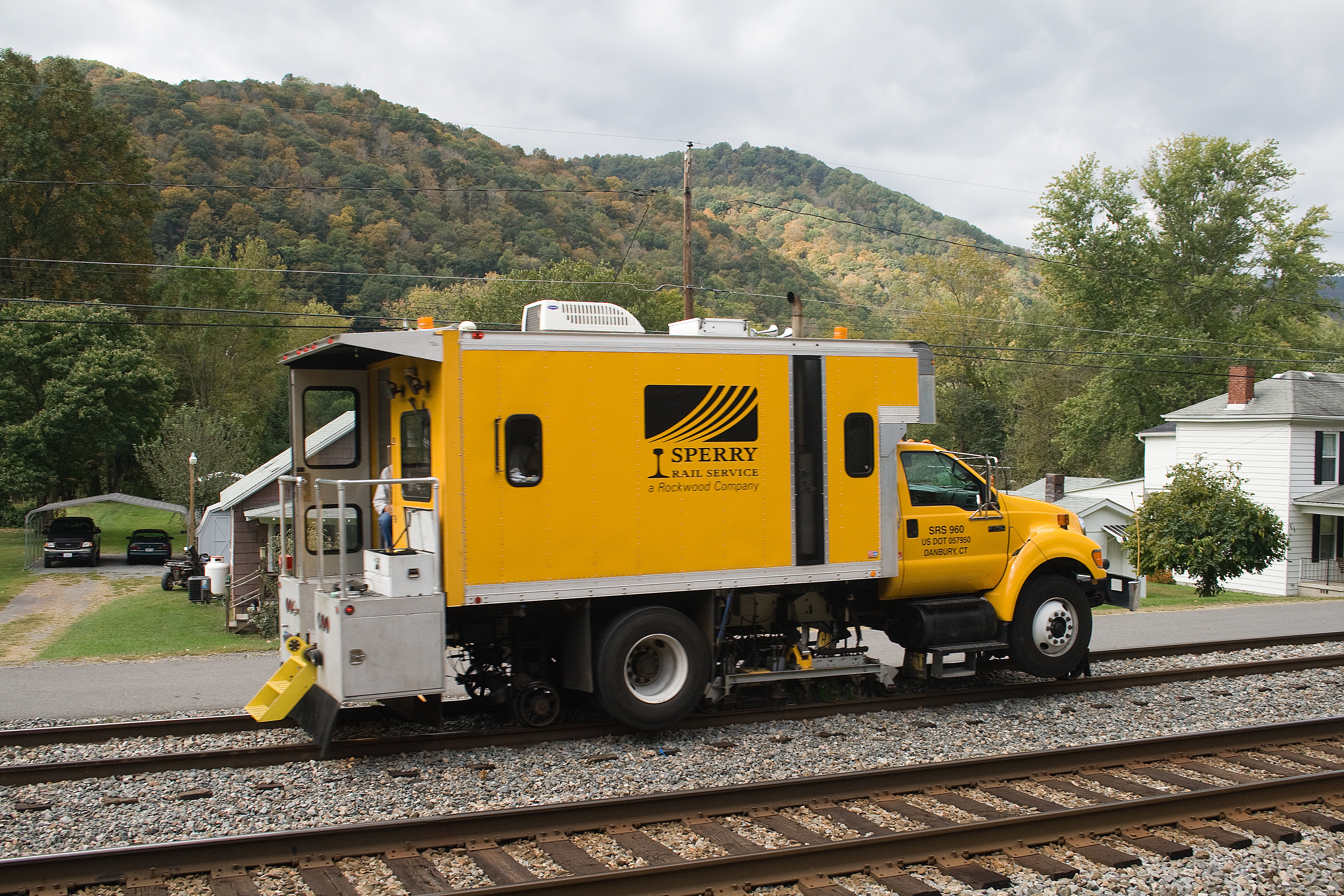
A hirail vehicle used by Sperry Rail Service to inspect tracks for defects

Robust inspections are key to a safe railroad and discovering flaws and wear in tracks early enough that they can be addressed before causing a derailment, or becoming so severe that the work must be done immediately, regardless of whether it is a convenient time to do so. This task is increasingly done using specialized train cars or vehicles that can check tracks for hidden defects, invisible to the human eye, surveying miles of track a day.

In the past, this task was often done by track workers, assigned sections of track to maintain and repair, and inspect for flaws. In the United States, where a crew could have responsibility for a significant distance, as long as 10–20 miles (16–32 km), workers would travel on speeders, a small rail vehicle designed for rail workers to travel along the tracks that could be put on the tracks by hand.

Specialized trains for the sole purpose of inspecting vast stretches of tracks, such as Japan Railways's Doctor Yellow, and Network Rail's New Measurement Train are increasing part of track-inspection plans. Some of these trains are also capable of inspecting electrification infrastructure. In June 2024, JR Central announced they would be phasing out their 'Doctor Yellow' trainsets in favor of incorporating inspection equipment on their N700S trainsets starting in 2027.

Britain's railway system still makes routine use of visual inspections by workers walking along sections of track. Trained railway staff, 'Patrollers', walk along train tracks looking for abnormal conditions, loose bolts, and damage to trackside infrastructure such as fencing. The frequency of patrols varies depending on factors such as track speed, the specific construction of the track and yearly tonnage on a route. When hot weather is forecasted, additional "hot weather patrols" are also implemented; specifically looking for bents or kinks, caused by the rails expanding in the heat.

== Repair and replacement ==
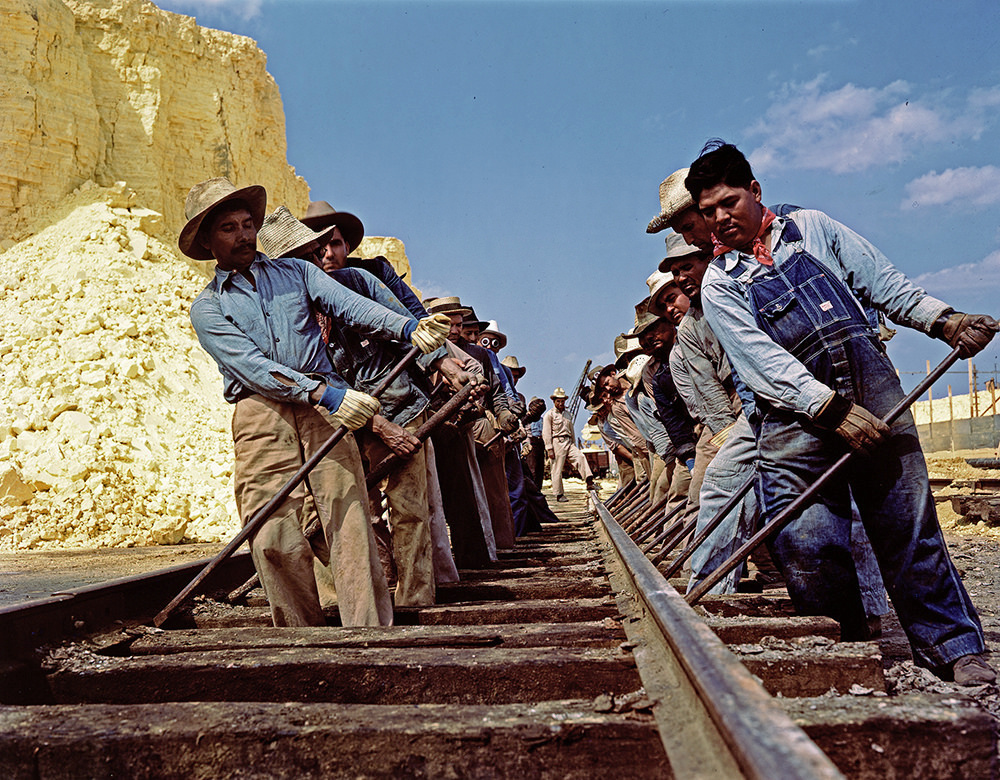
A track crew in Louisiana adjusting a railroad track using lining bars, in 1939.

The most fundamental maintenance of way task is the construction, repair, and replacement of the track and its supporting ballast and grade. In the early days of railroading, this task was almost entirely completed by manual labor. Teams of men, 'section crews', would be responsible for specific sections of track, each approximately 10–20 miles (16–32 km) long. Section crews would manually carry out tasks such as replacing worn out track components, clearing ditches and culverts, tamping ballast and removing snow and debris from switches.

For larger scale projects, specialized teams would be brought in to carry out the work. One account, by Joseph Noble, was that one of these crews of 110 men could replace 1 mile (1.6 km) of track in a 10 hour work day. As late as 1924, some track replacement crews were still doing the job entirely by hand, with crews even lifting rails by hand.

As the 20th century progressed, large scale track replacement became an increasingly mechanical task. The Spike puller replaced men manually prying spikes out of ties. A team of men with tie tongs manually removing a tie and inserting a new one replaced by a tie exchanger, manually driving spikes using a Spike maul replaced by a spike driver. The adjustment and packing of ballast by hand using shovels and ballast forks was replaced by a tamping machine and ballast regulator. Railroad cranes took over the task of lifting heavy track components such as ties and rails. Most of this equipment could be operated by a single person, or handful at most, dramatically reducing the workers needed to carry out a project. By the 1970s, a mechanized track-renewal crew was capable of replacing 400 ties on an average day, using as few as 43 men.

The section crew approach to maintenance has disappeared in the United States, with routine track work now carried out by teams of workers trained and equipped to carry out specific tasks like replacement of ties or damaged rails, that are sent around a company's rail network. Technology increasing has reduced the number of people needed for the important routine maintenance tasks that section crews needed to do, and in some cases, outright eliminated the job. Workers using brooms and shovels to clear snow and ice from frog of railroad switches, have been replaced by propane switch heaters. The increased use of Continuous welded rail has reduced joints which require attention and maintenance, such as checking for loose bolts on fishplates, which join non-welded rails together on non-welded, joined rails. Ditch digging and clearing can now be handled by workers using backhoes and excavators, or by specialized rail equipment that digs the ditch as it travels along a track.

== Signal systems ==
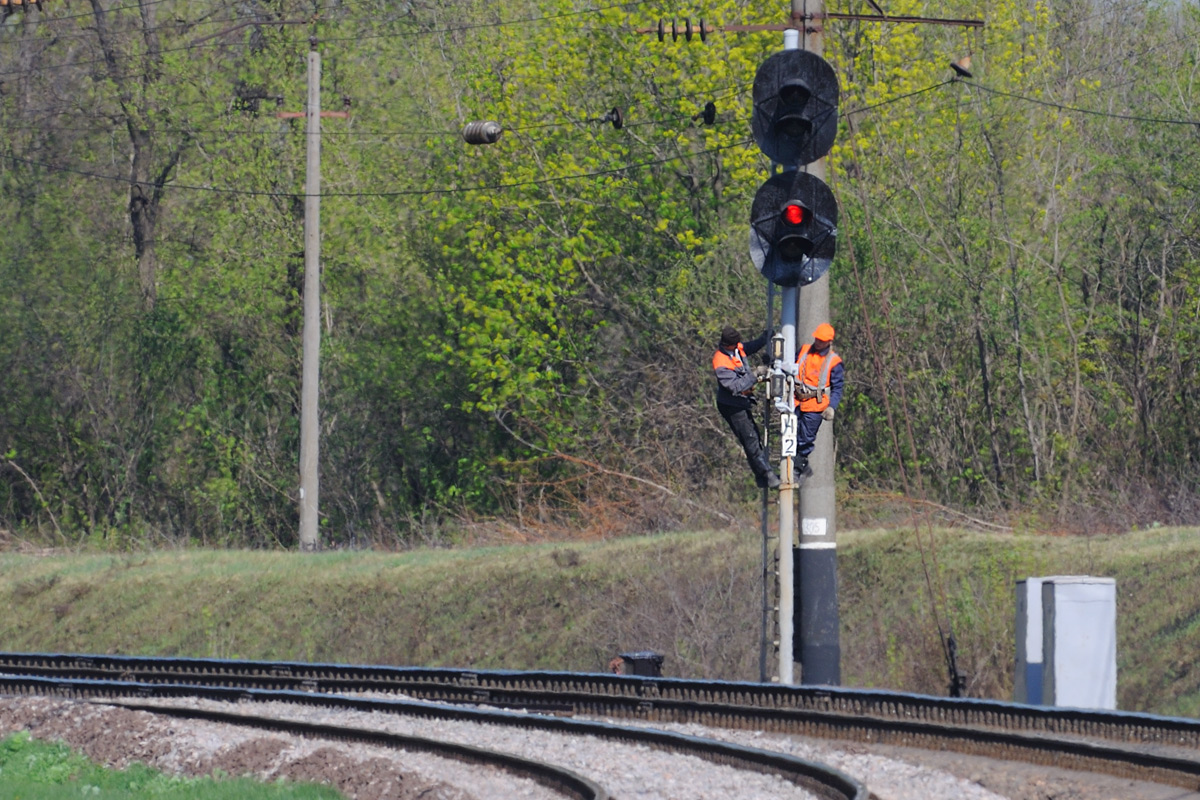
Maintenance work on a color light signal in Ukraine

Beyond the tracks, railways often have expansive, complicated signaling systems, that require constant maintenance to keep working. The work of railway signal technicians has evolved significantly over the history of rail transport, particularly in the 20th century, as signals advanced from mechanical semaphore signals, to electric color light signals, and in the 21st century, increasingly advanced train protection systems such as European Train Control System, which in more advanced installations, eliminate equipment such as trackside signals and track circuits, relying on location information via GSM-R to keep trains separated. Semaphore signals routinely require maintenance such as oiling and greasing of mechanical linkages that move the signals, refilling and adjusting of oil lamps on the signal, and verifying the semaphore arm's ability to move freely, and move into the correct positions. Electric color light signals require replacement of failed bulbs, and checking of electric circuits and relays, and replacement of failed electrical components. Signal maintaining staff would also assist in the care and upkeep of railroad switches, such as removal of debris preventing switches from moving, oil and greasing of motors.

== Electrification systems ==
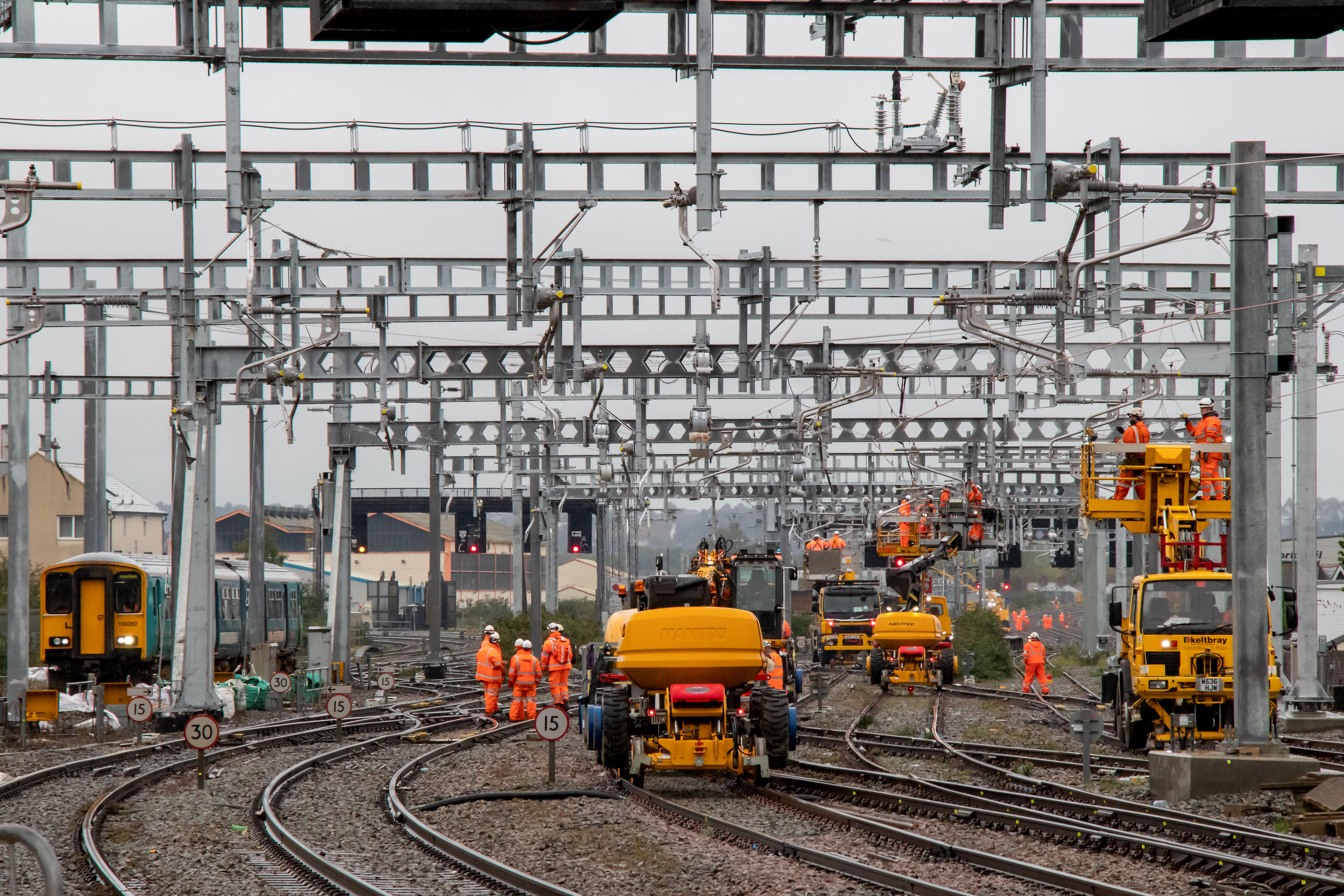
Maintenance of overhead line equipment at Cardiff Central, in Wales

On rail lines which include electrification by a third rail or an overhead line system, maintenance of way work also includes installing, repairing and replacing these systems.

Overhead line electrification while complex, is a task that with proper planning, done from trains on existing rail lines. British Rail, during the 1960s-1980s, during large scale projects to electrify routes such as the West Coast Main Line and East Coast Main Line, developed trains that could carry out the various tasks, boring foundations for supports, preparing cement, standing up steel support structures and attaching the contact wire, in an assembly line like fashion.

The electrification of an existing route, can involve significant additional work to accommodate the new electrical system, such as changes to or complete demolition and rebuilding of bridges, station canopies and tunnels. Alternatives to enlarging a tunnel, or rebuilding a bridge, can include lowering the track bed, in turn lowering the tracks.

Contact wires have a lifespan of around 20-30 years. Beyond this point, the likelihood of a wire breaking, and falling from the overhead support structure, as well excessive wear on other components that connect the contact wire to the overhead structure. Failure to keep up with this maintenance can lead to catastrophic damage to both the overhead wire system as well as on train equipment, particularly the pantograph, even at relatively low speeds.

Trees and other vegetation pose a hazard to overhead wires: falling tree branches can cause wires to disconnect from the support structure and arcing can occur if vegetation gets too close to wires. This poses significant hazards, from bright light of an arc flash and starting fires, as well as disruptions to railroad operations from tripped circuit breakers and downed wires. The development and consistent following of plans to control vegetation near overhead lines is critical to safe and uninterrupted rail journeys. This typically involves the trimming of branches that have strayed within a predetermined distance of the wires, as well as removal of trees that are simply too close to overhead wires and will always pose an issue.

== See also ==
- Gandy dancer
- Railway track maintenance
- Rail inspection
- Work train

== Bibliography ==
- Solomon, Brian (2001). Railway Maintenance - The Men and Machines That Keep the Railroads Running. Osceola, Wis.: MBI Pub. Co. ISBN 0760309752. OCLC 317898090.
- Solomon, Brian (2006). Working on the Railroad (First ed.). St. Paul, MN: Voyageur Press. ISBN 978-0-7603-2220-8.
- Semmens, Peter William Brett (1991). Electrifying The East Coast Route (First ed.). Great Britain: Patrick Stephens Limited. ISBN 0-85059-929-6.
- Ellis, Ian (2010). British Railway Engineering Encyclopedia (Second ed.). Lulu Enterprises Incorporated. ISBN 978-1-4461-8190-4.
- British Railways (1962). The Signal Engineers (Videotape). British Transport Films.
- Noble, Joseph A. (1964). From Cab to Caboose - Fifty Years of Railroading (First ed.). University of Oklahoma Press.
- "ETCS Levels and Modes". transport.ec.europa.eu. European Commission. Archived from the original on 25 October 2023.
- Keenor, Garry (2021). Overhead Line Electrification for Railways (Sixth ed.).
- Middleton, William D. (April 1972). "The Assistant Division Engineer". Trains. No. 4. A.C. Kalmbach.
- Morgan, William T. (August 1979). "Gandy dancing in Kamki Tacho". Trains. No. 8. A.C. Kalmbach. pp. 20–21.
- Urquhart, Leonard Church; Babcock, John B. (1940). "Section 2 - Railway & Highway Engineering". Civil Engineering Handbook (2nd ed.). New York: McGraw-Hill Book Company, Inc.
- Rosbotham, T.H.; Hall, I.J. (1960). Overhead Equipment: Erection (PDF) (Report). British Railways. Archived from the original (PDF) on 10 November 2020.
- Kyodo News (13 June 2024). "Japan's beloved "Doctor Yellow" track-testing bullet train to retire". Kyodo News.
