= Pandrol =

Rail fastener manufacturer

Pandrol Ltd
- Type: Private company
- Industry: Manufacturing
- Headquarters: Colombes, France
- Products: Rail fastenings, aluminothermic welding, equipment and electrification
- Net income: £60.9 million
- Parent: Delachaux Group
- Website: pandrol.com

Pandrol is a global railway infrastructure equipment and technology company. It is presently a member of the Delachaux Group and based in Colombes, France and has 1,700 employees globally in over 40 locations. Pandrol has sold its various products to over 400 railway systems around the world.

The company was founded as the Elastic Rail Spike Company (ERS) in London during 1937 to produce and sell an innovative rail fastening developed by the German engineer, Max Rüping. In the subsequent decades, it focused on the development and manufacture of such fastenings for securing rails to railway sleepers, being awarded numerous patents for this work. During the 1950s, the Norwegian railway engineer, Per Pande-Rolfsen, designed the Pandrol clip. This product became so successful that, in 1972, the business was renamed Pandrol.

Over time, the company had branched out into other product lines and activities, including maintenance personnel training, and the design and manufacture of tooling and other equipment to make the construction and maintenance of railways easier and more efficient. In 2003, the company was acquired by the French conglomerate Delachaux. On 17 November 2017, all entities under Delachaux were unified under the Pandrol identity. During the 21st century, it has expanded considerably in Asia, a large portion of this growth coming from the Pandrol Rahee Technologies joint venture with the Indian railway manufacturer Rahee.

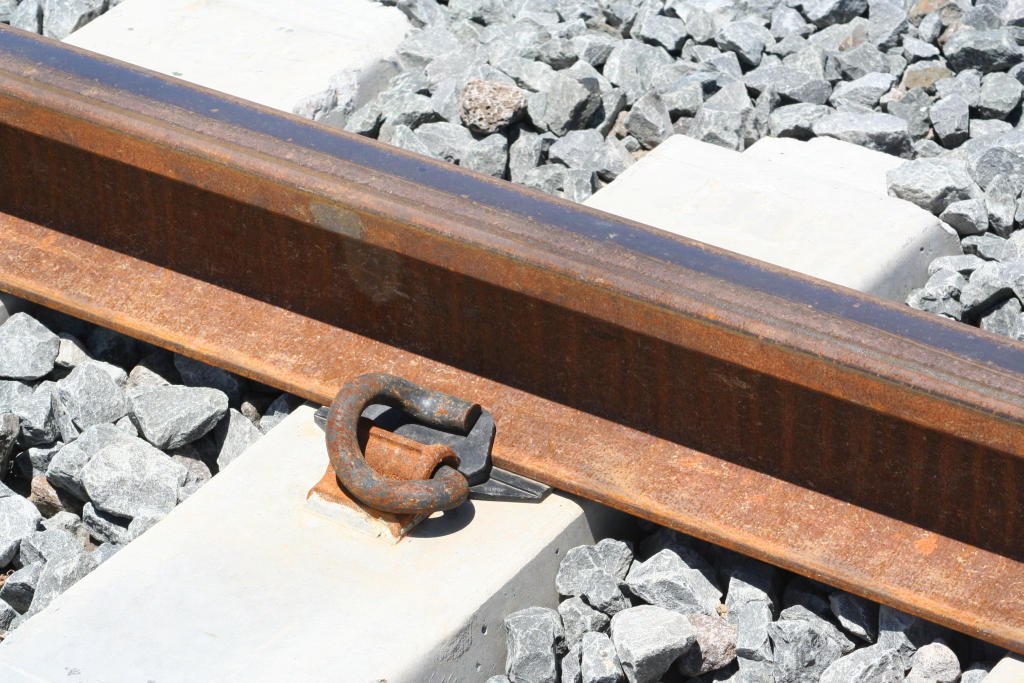
A Pandrol E clip in use

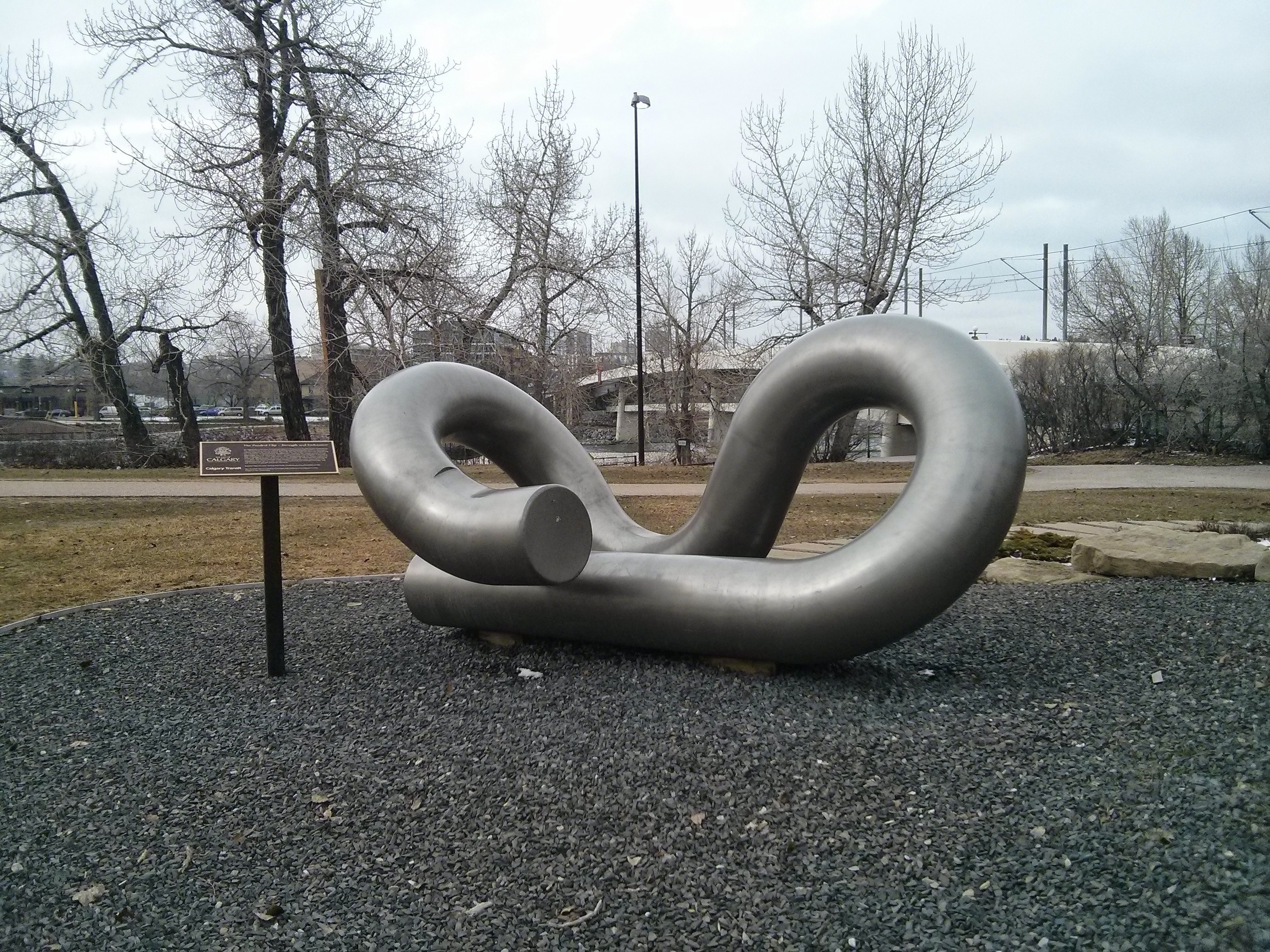
Statue of a Pandrol PR clip in Calgary

== Products ==
The Pandrol clip was patented in 1957 by Norwegian railways engineer, Per Pande-Rolfsen. It is now common worldwide. The original clip is now called the PR-clip, which was superseded by a system called E-Clip. Numerous other products made by Pandrol have been designed to work in conjunction with the E-Clip.

A key area of product development for the company has been greater sustainability. As a part of this ambition, Pandrol has a range of sustainable resilient systems and battery-powered tools called E+. Each E+ product has been designed to cut carbon emissions without compromising power. A focus on reducing noise and eliminating dangerous fumes will contribute to reduced environmental impact, particularly in urban and under-tunnel areas.

The company has focused on aspects such as noise reduction and vibration reduction in recent years as numerous customers have approached Pandrol with concerns in this area. Amongst other solutions, Pandrol has launched Under-Ballast mats (UBMs) and Under Sleeper Pads (USPs) that partially resolve such problems on ballasted track; the QTrack (for embedded track) and Floating Slab Mat (FSM) are amongst the fastening system solutions that have been developed for use on slabtrack. During 2023, Pandrol launched a Common Interface System for ballastless track; it is designed to accept a variety of different screwed and non-screwed rail fastening assemblies so that they can be adapted quickly and affordably to suit different requirements and restrictions.

== History ==
During the 1930s, a German engineer, Max Rüping, developed a resilient fastening to secure a rail to a sleeper. In 1933, Rüping went into business with an American importer of creosote named Oscar Max von Bernuth (O. M. Bernuth), founder of Bernuth-Lembcke Company. At the time, the fastening was known as the Elastic Rail Spike. The product proved to be successful in track tests and the Elastic Rail Spike Company (ERS) was formed in London in 1937.

Throughout the 1940s, the business expanded internationally, led by General Manager Stewart Sanson. Patents were registered across the globe, including in India and Burma in 1943. Immediately after the Second World War, ERS acquired a lease on a government-owned factory in Worksop to undertake spike production. This site has remained Pandrol’s UK manufacturing base to the present day.

In 1958, Sanson was approached by a young Norwegian engineer named Per Pande-Rolfsen, who had invented a new type of indirect fastening which was fully resilient and did not transmit vibrations from passing trains. The self-tensioning spring clip was far more adaptable than any other product on the market, and ERS registered international licensing rights on behalf of Rolfsen. Taking two syllables from the name of its creator, the indirect fastening was christened ‘the Pandrol clip’, or the PR clip. In 1966, it was adopted as standard by British Railways; one year later, South African Railways followed.

During 1972, the Elastic Spike Company changed its name to Pandrol. Five years later, Pandrol established a US-based subsidiary to better serve the North American market.

The 1980s was a time of rapid expansion for Pandrol; it opened new offices and manufacturing sites in both South Korea and Indonesia while its e-clips were installed for the first time in Japan. As a result of the acquisition of Vortok in 1991, Pandrol gained a range of solutions for rail track maintenance, rail signalling and rail stressing problems.

In 1992, Pandrol trialled an innovative new fastening, the Fastclip; it was quickly adopted by multiple heavy freight railways in North America. Within five years, more than five million Fastclips had been installed worldwide. During late 2003, Réseau Ferré de France (RFF) mandated the use of the Fastclip as its standard fastening for both new lines and renewal activities.

In early 1999, the British engineering conglomerate Charter plc announced that it was seeking to spin out its Pandrol Rail Fastenings subsidiary. In 2003, the company was acquired by Delachaux of France. On 17 November 2017, all the businesses within the rail division of the Delachaux group were united under the single brand of Pandrol.

During the 2000s, Pandrol expanded further into Asia, including the formation of a joint venture (Pandrol Rahee Technologies) with the Indian railway manufacturer Rahee in 2005. In November 2018, Pandrol Rahee Technologies opened a fastening manufacturing plant in Hyderabad. During the late 2010s, Pandrol Rahee Technologies was contracted to design, manufacture and supply a bespoke rail fastening system for the Mumbai Naval Dockyard. Five years later, Pandrol Rahee Technologies opened a new foundry in West Bengal.

In December 2008, Pandrol acquired the Swedish rail equipment manufacturer Rosenqvist Group. During January 2024, Pandrol arranged to sell its Hudiksvall facility in Sweden to its former owner, the Rosenqvist Group; as a part of the commercial arrangements for the sale, Pandrol became the exclusive distributor of Rosenqvist Rail products for certain markets, including the UK, Ireland, France, Australia.

On 6 January 2017, CDM Group sold its track division to Pandrol. Following the sale of KLK Electro Materiales in 2021, the engineering, development and trading of rigid and tramway catenaries was carried out by Pandrol instead.

During December 2020, Pandrol opened a new Centre of Excellence in Raismes, France as a part of the expansion and improvement of the company's training facilities.
