= Spike driver =

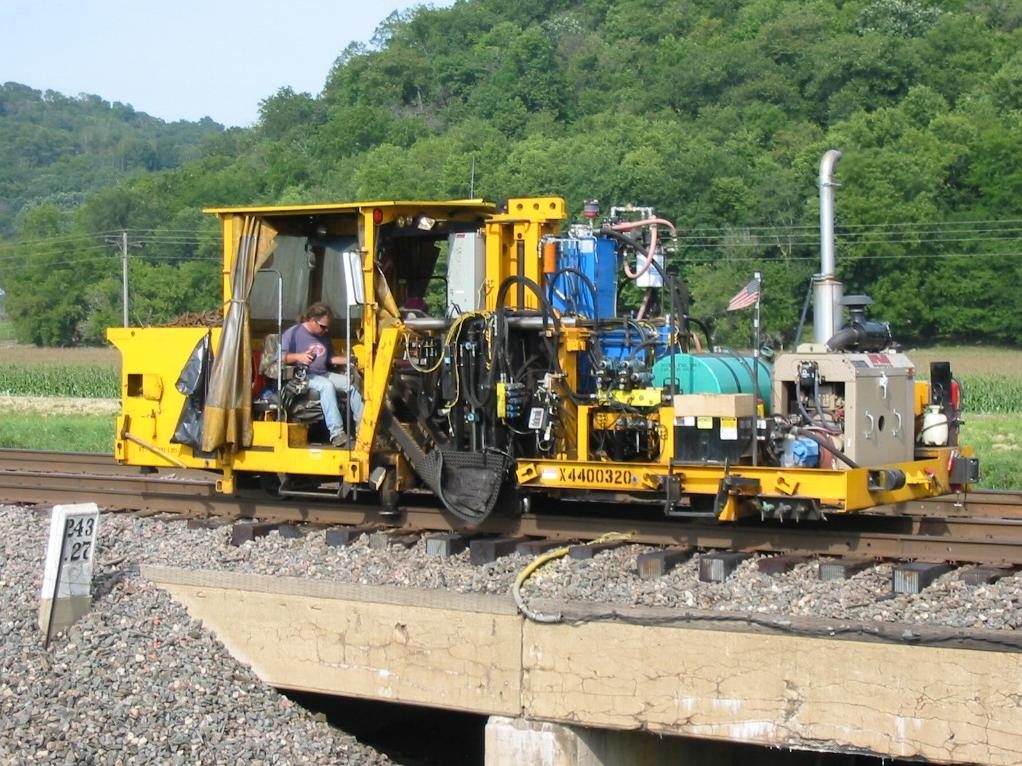
A BNSF spiker in operation in Prairie du Chien, Wisconsin

A spike driver (also known as a spiker) is a piece of rail transport maintenance of way equipment. Its purpose is to drive rail spikes into the ties on a rail track to hold the rail in place. Many different sizes of spikers are manufactured and in use around the world.

== History ==
Historically, spikers was the slang-name for the rail workers who drove in the spikes after the gandy dancers laid the track on the tie. Spikes are used to hold the rail in gauge and keep it connected to the ties. Before the development of automated spikers, this task was done entirely by hand using spike hammers to drive the spikes into the ties. This process was slow and not easy to learn (at the driving of the golden spike that marked the completion of the first transcontinental railroad in 1869, several executives of the companies building the railroad tried and failed to drive in the final spike, showing how difficult a task it was).

To make the process of driving spikes faster and easier, automated self-propelled machines that travel on the rails were developed in the 1900s. These machines can insert spikes far faster than by hand. Brian Solomon writes that, "Spike drivers take less time to accomplish their tasks than it takes to read about it."

== Method of operation ==
When in operation, a spiker works by using rams to drive spikes into the ties, using either compressed air or hydraulics to power the rams. The spiker uses chutes to automatically feed spikes to the rams, which are present on both sides of the machine to allow spikes to be inserted on both rails at the same time. A worker will periodically add fresh spikes to the chutes as needed to keep the machine supplied. On larger spikers, spikes are supplied from a feed bin, eliminating the need to add spikes by hand. Railroad workers operate the machine by directing the rams and moving the spiker, which is usually self-propelled and powered by a diesel engine. The process is as follows:

1. The spiker moves to a tie that needs spikes inserted. The spiker uses claws to grab the tie and hold it in place.
2. Workers use a joystick to direct the rams to the locations where spikes are to be inserted, and then activate the rams to drive the spikes into the rail.
3. The spiker releases the tie, and moves on to the next tie to repeat the process.

A typical spiker has controls on both sides of the machine, allowing it to operate when only one of the two rails needs spikes inserted.

== Manufacturers of spikers ==
- Harsco
- Nordco
