= Spike maul =

Hand tool

A spike maul is a hand tool used to drive railroad spikes in railroad track work. It is also known as a spiking hammer.

== Description ==
Spike mauls are akin to sledge hammers, typically weighing from 8 to 12 pounds (4 to 5 kg) with handles 30 to 36 inches (80 to 90 cm) long. They have elongated double faced hardened steel heads. The head is typically over 12 inches (30 cm) long to allow the user to drive spikes on the opposite side of the rail without breaking the handle.

Some spike mauls have symmetrical heads, but most have a slightly longer thinner side and a shorter larger diameter side of equal weight. The long side allows a user to spike over abnormally tall rails, and to drive spikes down next to highway crossing planks. The shorter side provides more surface area which requires less accuracy for normal spiking.

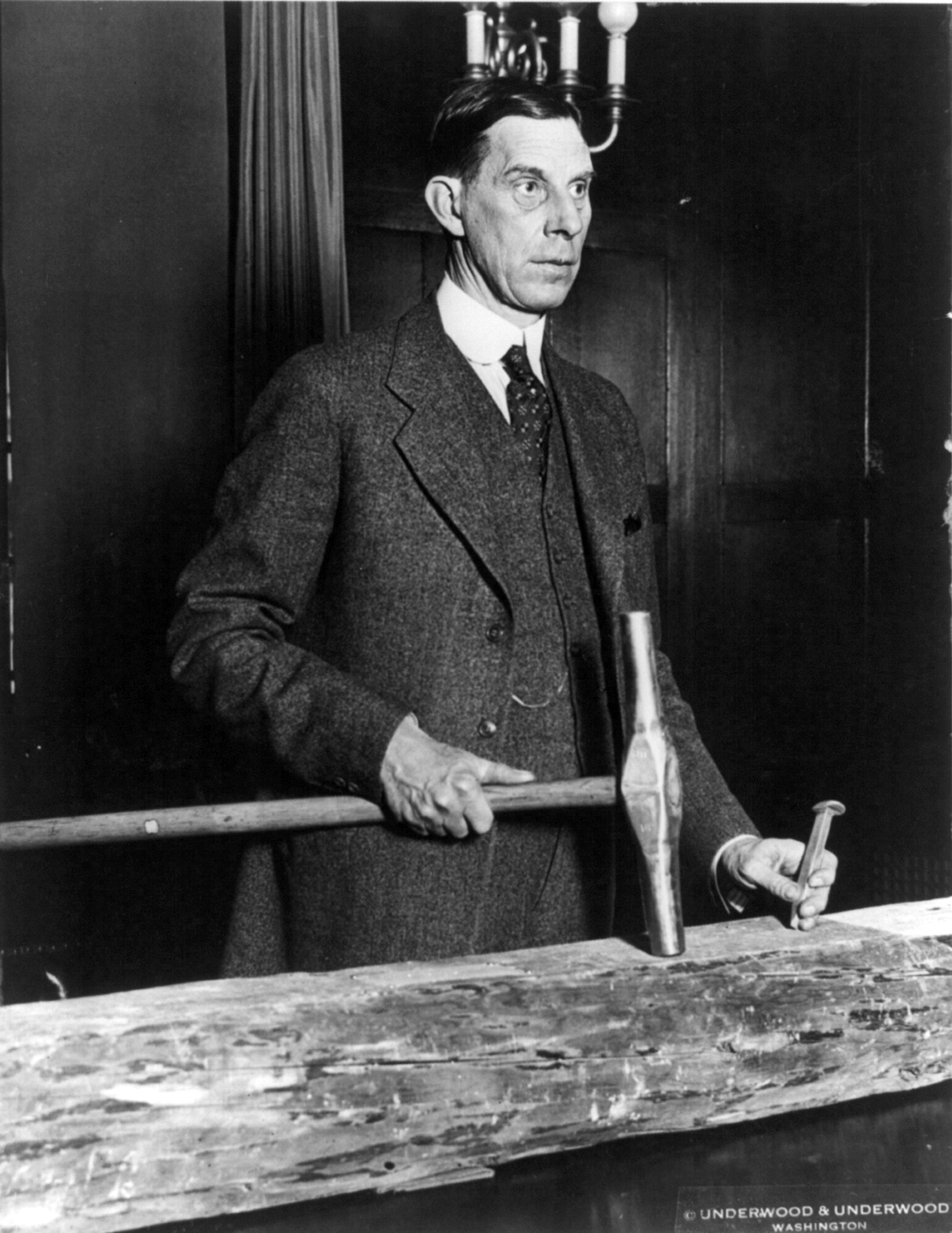
Ray Lyman Wilbur with first spike from Boulder Dam

There are two typical patterns of spike mauls:

- Bell: The more common, bell spike mauls are mostly cylindrical in shape.
- Standard: Which feature a square cross section, and a squared tapered end opposite the normal driving face.

Handles are often ash or hickory, but lesser wood species in economy handles, and nonconductive fiberglass (valuable in work on electrified track), are also found.

Almost all modern spike mauls take a standard 36-inch (90 cm) oval eye sledge hammer handle.

== Brands ==
Brands of spike mauls include Slug-Devil, Tamco and Warwood.
