= Outline of rail transport =

Overview of and topical guide to rail transport

Rail transport – means of conveyance of passengers and goods by way of wheeled vehicles running on rail tracks consisting of steel rails installed on sleepers/ties and ballast.

== What type of thing is rail transport? ==
Rail transport can be described as all of the following:

- Technology – making, usage, and knowledge of tools, machines, techniques, crafts, systems or methods of organization in order to solve a problem or perform a specific function. It can also refer to the collection of such tools, machinery, and procedures.
  - Applied technology – practical use of technology in every day life.
    - Transport – movement of humans, animals and goods from one location to another.

== Essence of rail transport ==
- Railway systems engineering
  - Environmental design in rail transportation
- Rail transport operations
  - List of railway industry occupations
- Passenger train
- Rail freight transport
  - Industrial railway

== Types of railway/railroad ==
- Mainline services
  - Inter-city rail
  - High-speed rail
  - Higher-speed rail
  - Heritage railway
  - Regional rail
  - Commuter rail
  - Mountain railway
- Plateway
  - Wagonway
- Rack railway
  - Fell mountain railway system
- Tourist railroad

=== Urban rail transport, general types ===
- Urban rail transit – overview
  - Rapid transit
    - Elevated railway
    - Monorail
    - Medium-capacity rail system/light rapid transit/light metro
  - Light rail
    - Interurban
    - Premetro
    - Stadtbahn
    - Tramway (or streetcar)
      - Very light rail
- Cable railway
  - Funicular (or inclined railway)
- People mover

== History of rail transport ==
History of rail transport

- Chronological list: Lists of rail transport events by year
- Lists of rail accidents
  - List of rail accidents (2000–present)
- Railroad chronometer
- Railway Mail Service (USA)
  - Railway post office
- Railway Mania (UK)
- Railway Express Agency (USA)

== Vehicles ==
- Car float
- Road-rail vehicle
  - Rail car mover
- Railgrinder
- Train ferry

=== Trains ===
- Train
  - Parts
    - Bogie
    - Wheelset
  - Rolling stock
    - Railroad car
    - Railbus
    - Railcar
- Tram
  - Tram-train

==== Locomotives ====
- Locomotive
  - Steam locomotive
  - Diesel locomotive
  - Electric locomotive

== Railway infrastructure ==
- Railway platform

=== Permanent way ===
- Axe ties
- Baulk road
- Breather switch
- Cant
- Clip and scotch
- Datenail
- Fishplate
- Ladder track
- Minimum radius
- Permanent way (current)
- Permanent way (history)
- Rail fastening system
- Rail profile
- Railroad tie (sleeper)
- Track ballast
- Track transition curve

=== Trackwork and track structures ===
- Balloon loop
- Classification yard
- Gauntlet track
- Junction
- Overhead lines
- Passing loop
- Rail track
- Rail yard
- Railroad switch
- Railway electrification system
- Railway turntable
- Siding
- Track gauge
- Track pan
- Tramway track
- Water crane
- Wye

==== Railway track layouts ====
===== Running lines =====
Track (Running lines)

- Single track
- Passing loop
- Double track
- Quadruple track
- Crossover

===== Rail sidings =====
Rail sidings

- Balloon loop
- Headshunt
- Rail yard
- Classification yard

===== Rail junctions =====
Rail junctions

- Flying junction
- Level junction
- Double junction
- Facing and trailing
- Grand union
- Wye
- Switch / turnout / points
- Swingnose crossing
- Level crossing

===== Railway station track layouts =====
Railway station

- Side platform
- Island platform
- Bay platform
- Split platform
- Terminal station
- Balloon loop
- Spanish solution
- Cross-platform interchange
- Interchange station

===== Hillclimbing =====
Hillclimbing

- Horseshoe curve
- Zig Zag / Switchback
- Spiral

=== Signalling and safety ===
- Block post
- Buffer stop
- Catch points
- Integrated Electronic Control Centre
- Interlocking
- Level crossing
- Loading gauge
- Railway signal
- Railway signalling
- Signalling control
- Structure gauge

=== Buildings ===
- Coaling tower
- Goods shed
- Motive power depot
- Roundhouse
- Station building
- Train shed
- Train station

== Rail transport by region ==
- Rail transport by country
  - Rail transport in Argentina
  - Rail transport in Australia
  - Rail transport in Belgium
  - Rail transport in Brazil
  - Rail transport in Canada
  - Rail transport in China
  - Rail transport in France
  - Rail transport in Germany
  - Rail transport in Hong Kong
  - Rail transport in India
  - Rail transport in Italy
  - Rail transport in Japan
  - Rail transport in Kazakhstan
  - Rail transport in Mexico
  - Rail transport in Namibia
  - Rail transport in the Netherlands
  - Rail transport in New Zealand
  - Rail transport in Poland
  - Rail transport in Portugal
  - Rail transport in Russia
  - Rail transport in South Africa
  - Rail transport in South Korea
  - Rail transport in Spain
  - Rail transport in Taiwan
  - Rail transport in Ukraine
  - Rail transport in the United Kingdom
  - Rail transportation in the United States
- List of countries by rail transport network size
- List of countries by rail usage

== Rail transport politics ==
- Rail transport laws
  - Esch-Cummins Act
  - Interstate Commerce Act of 1887
  - Rail Passenger Service Act
  - Railroad Revitalization and Regulatory Reform Act
  - Railway Construction Act
  - Railway Labor Act
  - Railway Nationalization Act
- Railways Act (United Kingdom railway legislation)
  - Railways Act 1921
  - Railways Act 1993
  - Railways Act 2005
  - Privatisation of British Rail
  - Impact of the privatisation of British Rail
- Railway nationalization
- Rail transport agencies
  - Railway Procurement Agency (Ireland)

== Rail culture ==
- Rail trail
- Rail transport modelling
- Rail usage statistics by country
- Railfan
- Railroad Museum of Pennsylvania
- Rail directions
- Usage of the terms railroad and railway
- Passenger rail terminology

== General concepts ==
- Conductor (rail)
- Rail pass
- Train ticket
- Transit pass

== Rail transport organizations ==
- National Union of Rail, Maritime and Transport Workers
- International Association of Railway Operations Research
- International Union of Railways

== Rail transport publications ==
- List of railroad-related periodicals

== Persons influential in rail transport ==
- List of people associated with rail transport
- George Stephenson (1781–1848)
- Robert Stephenson (1803–1859)
- Isambard Kingdom Brunel (1806–1859)
- Thomas Brassey (1805–1870)

== See also ==
- Glossary of rail transport terms
- List of heritage railways
- List of named passenger trains
- List of rail gauges
- List of railway industry occupations
- List of railway companies
- List of railway roundhouses
- List of suburban and commuter rail systems
- Megaproject
- Mine railway
- Railway Technical Centre
