= Railway research =

Articles on Railway research include:

- International Association of Railway Operations Research
- Matrai, Iran Railway Research Center
- Railway Technical Research Institute, Japan
- British Rail Research Division, Derby
