= History of the railway track =

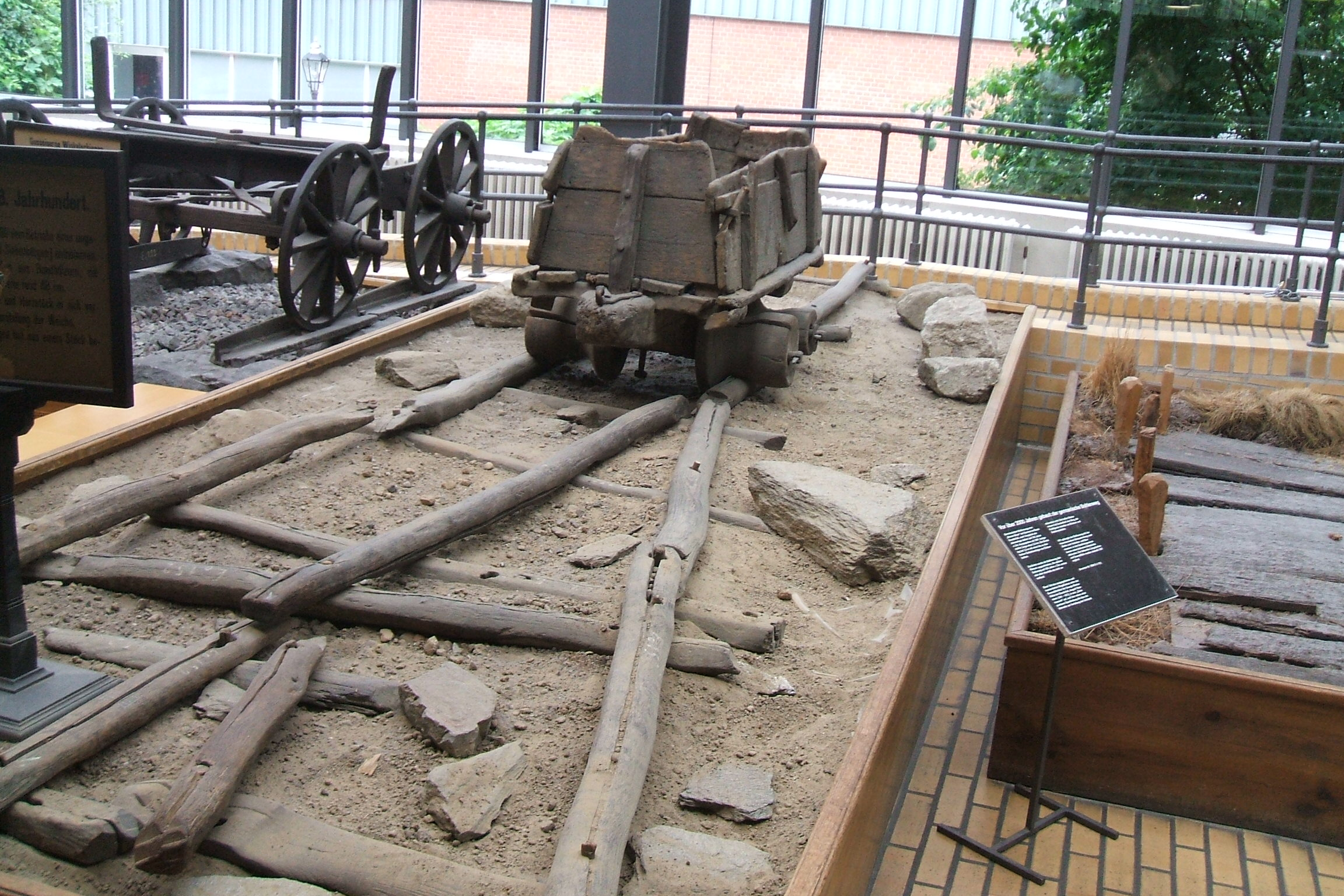
Section of timber track from a 16th-century gold mine in Transylvania. The wagons were guided by the pronounced flange on the wooden wheels, and the narrow gauge of 480 mm (18 7/8 in) allowed the points to be altered by swinging the single switch rail.

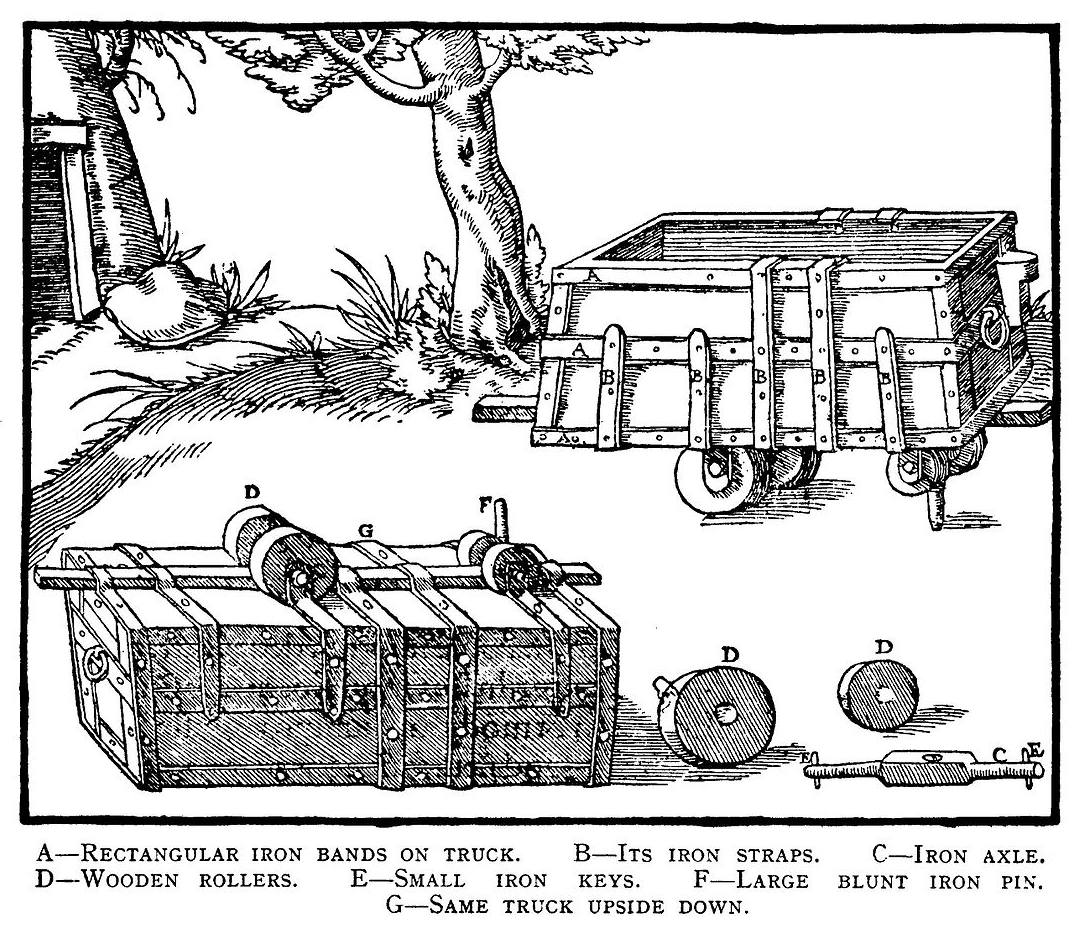
Contemporary illustration of guided truck used in 16th-century mines in Germany

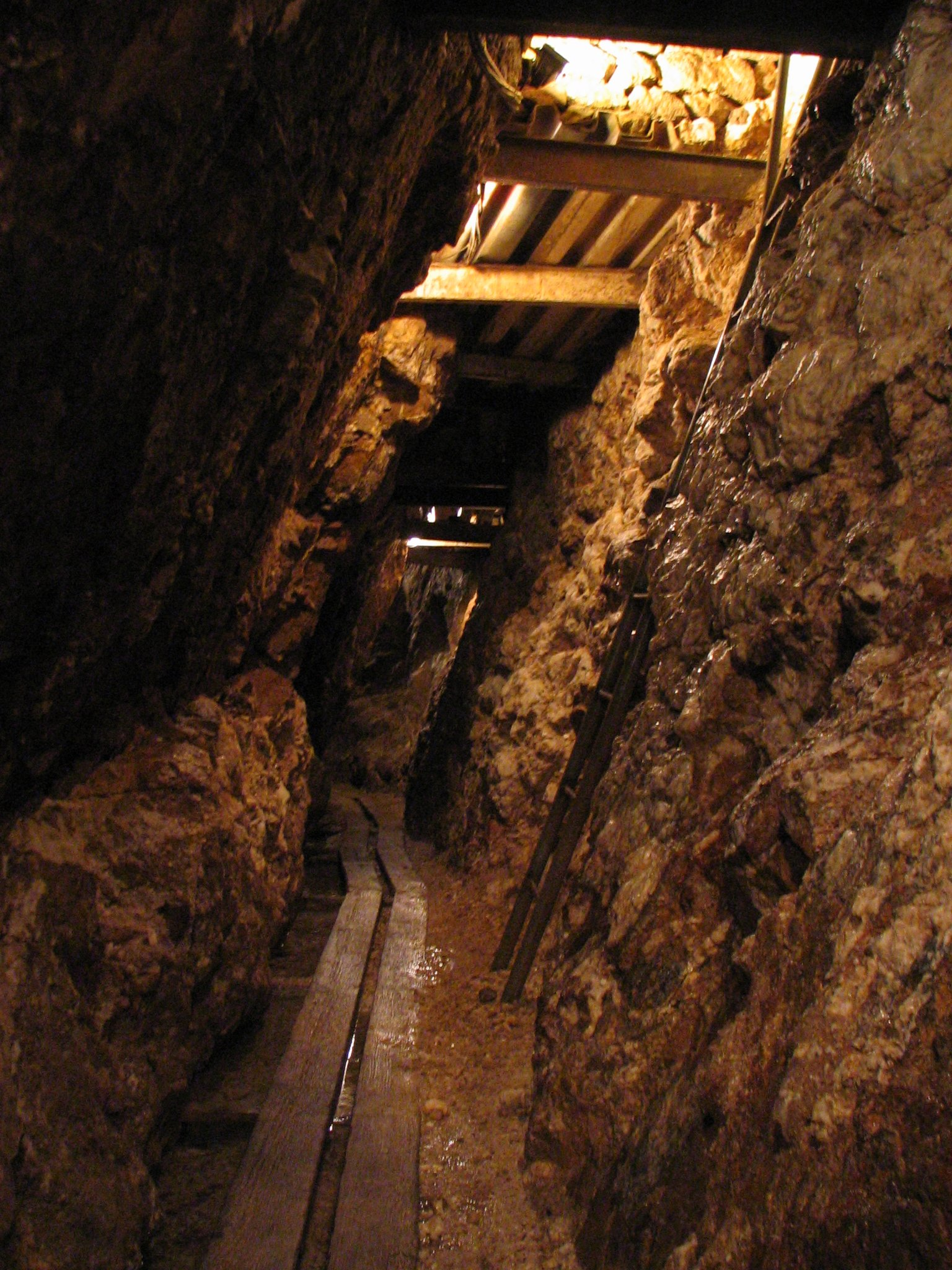
Reconstruction of flat wooden track for transporting silver ore; guidance was by a vertical pin running between the timbers

The railway track or permanent way is the elements of railway lines: generally the pairs of rails typically laid on the sleepers or ties embedded in ballast, intended to carry the ordinary trains of a railway. It is described as a permanent way because, in the earlier days of railway construction, contractors often laid a temporary track to transport spoil and materials about the site; when this work was substantially completed, the temporary track was taken up and the permanent way installed.

The earliest tracks consisted of wooden rails on transverse wooden sleepers, which helped maintain the spacing of the rails. Various developments followed, with cast iron plates laid on top of the wooden rails and later wrought iron plates or wrought iron angle plates (angle iron as L-shaped plate rails). Rails were also individually fixed to rows of stone blocks, without any cross ties to maintain correct separation. This system also led to problems, as the blocks could individually move. The first version of Isambard Kingdom Brunel's 7 ft (2,134 mm) broad gauge system used rails laid on longitudinal sleepers whose rail gauge and elevation were pinned down by being tied to piles (conceptually akin to a pile bridge), but this arrangement was expensive and Brunel soon replaced it with what became the classic broad gauge track, in which the piles were forgone and transoms, similar to sleepers, maintained the rail gauge. Today, most rail track uses the standard system of rail and sleepers; ladder track is used in a few applications.

Developments in manufacturing technologies has led to changes to the design, manufacture and installation of rails, sleepers and the means of attachments. Cast iron rails, 4 feet (1.2 m) long, began to be used in the 1790s and by 1820, 15-foot-long (4.6 m) wrought iron rails were in use. The first steel rails were made in 1857 and standard rail lengths increased over time from 30 to 60 feet (9.1–18.3 m). Rails were typically specified by units of weight per linear length and these also increased. Railway sleepers were traditionally made of creosote-treated hardwoods and this continued through to modern times. Continuous welded rail was introduced into Britain in the mid 1960s and this was followed by the introduction of concrete sleepers.

== Wooden tracked systems ==
=== Plank ways ===
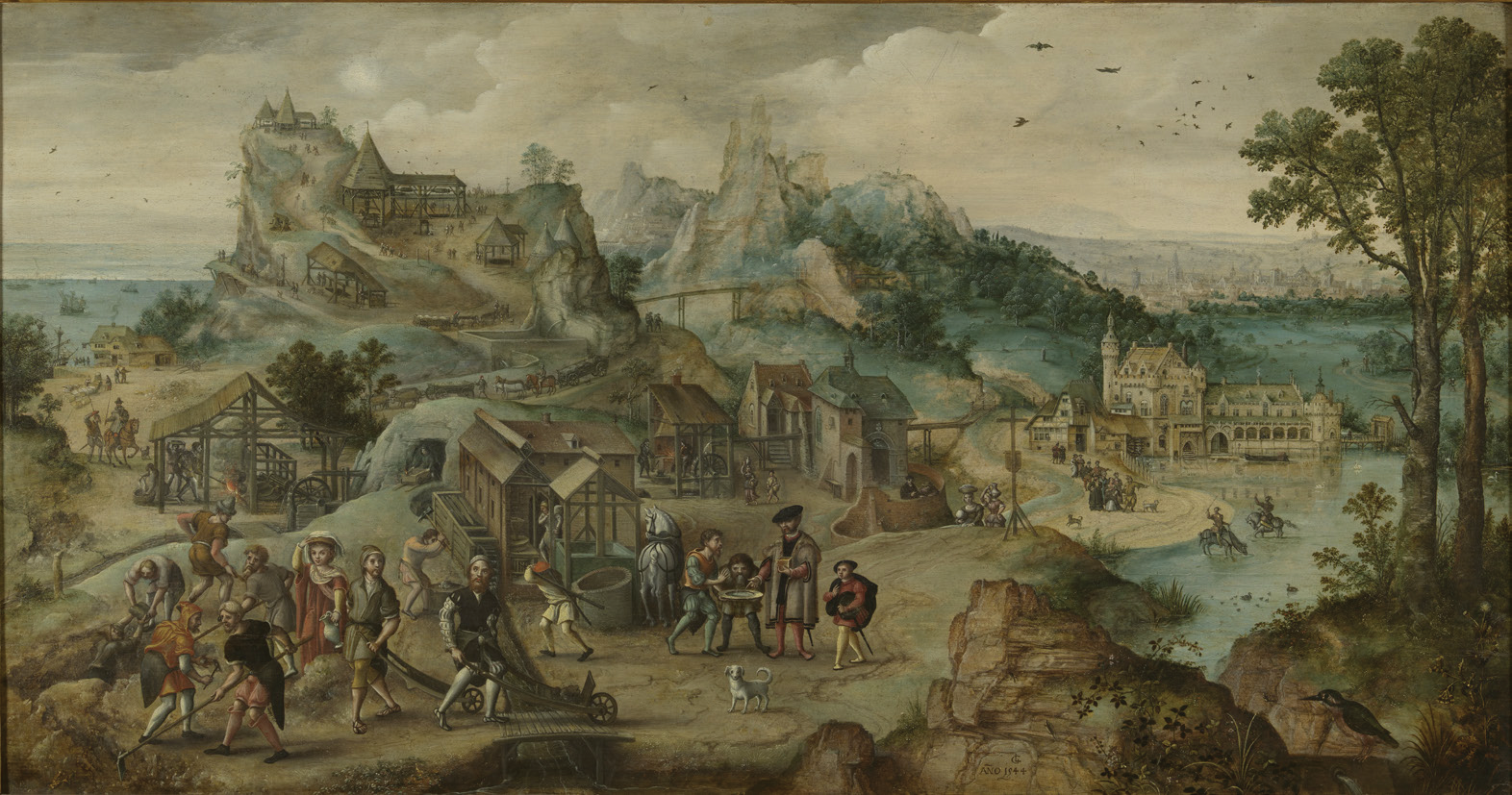
Fragment of Lucas Gassel's 1544 painting The Coppermine depicting railway

The earliest use of a railway track seems to have been in connection with mining in Germany in the 12th century. Mine passageways were usually wet and muddy, and moving barrows of ore along them was extremely difficult. Improvements were made by laying timber planks so that wheeled containers could be dragged along by manpower. By the 16th century, the difficulty of keeping the wagon running straight had been solved by having a pin going into a gap between the planks. Georg Agricola describes box-shaped carts, called "dogs", about half as large again as a wheelbarrow, fitted with a blunt vertical pin and wooden rollers running on iron axles. An Elizabethan era example of this has been discovered at Silvergill in Cumbria, England, and they were probably also in use in the nearby Mines Royal of Grasmere, Newlands and Caldbeck. Where space permitted round-section wooden tracks to take trucks with flanged wheels were installed: a painting from 1544 by the Flemish artist Lucas Gassel shows a coppermine with rails of this type emerging from an adit.

=== Edged rails ===
A different system was developed in England, probably in the late 16th century, near Broseley for conveying coal from mines, sometimes drift mines down the side of the Severn Gorge to the River Severn. This, probably a rope-hauled incline plane, had existed 'long before' 1605. This probably preceded the Wollaton Wagonway of 1604, which has hitherto been regarded as the first.

In Shropshire, the gauge was usually narrow, to enable the wagons to be taken underground in drift mines. However, by far the greatest number of wagonways were near Newcastle upon Tyne, where a single wagon was hauled by a horse on a wagonway of about the modern standard gauge. These took coal from the pithead down to a staithe, where the coal was loaded into river boats called keels.

Wear of the timber rails was a problem. They could be renewed by turning them over, but had to be regularly replaced. Sometimes, the rail was made in two parts, so that the top portion could easily be replaced when worn out. The rails were held together by wooden sleepers, covered with ballast to provide a surface for the horse to walk on.

== Early iron rails ==
Cast iron strips could be laid on top of timber rails, and the use of such materials probably occurred in 1738, but there are claims that this technology went back to 1716. In 1767, Ketley ironworks began producing cast iron plates, which were fixed to the top of wooden rails with nails, to provide a more durable running surface. This construct was known as strap-iron rail (or strap rail) and was widely used on pre-steam railways in the United States. Although relatively cheap and quick to build, they were unsuited to heavy loads and required 'excessive maintenance'. Train wheels rolling over the spikes loosened them, allowing the rail to break free and curve upwards sufficiently that a car wheel could get beneath it and force the end of the rail up through the floor of the car, writhing and twisting, endangering passengers. These broken rails became known as "snake heads".

When wrought iron became available, wrought iron plates provided an even more durable surface. The rails had projecting lugs (or ears) with a hole to enable them to be fixed to the underlying wooden rail.

=== Iron plateways ===
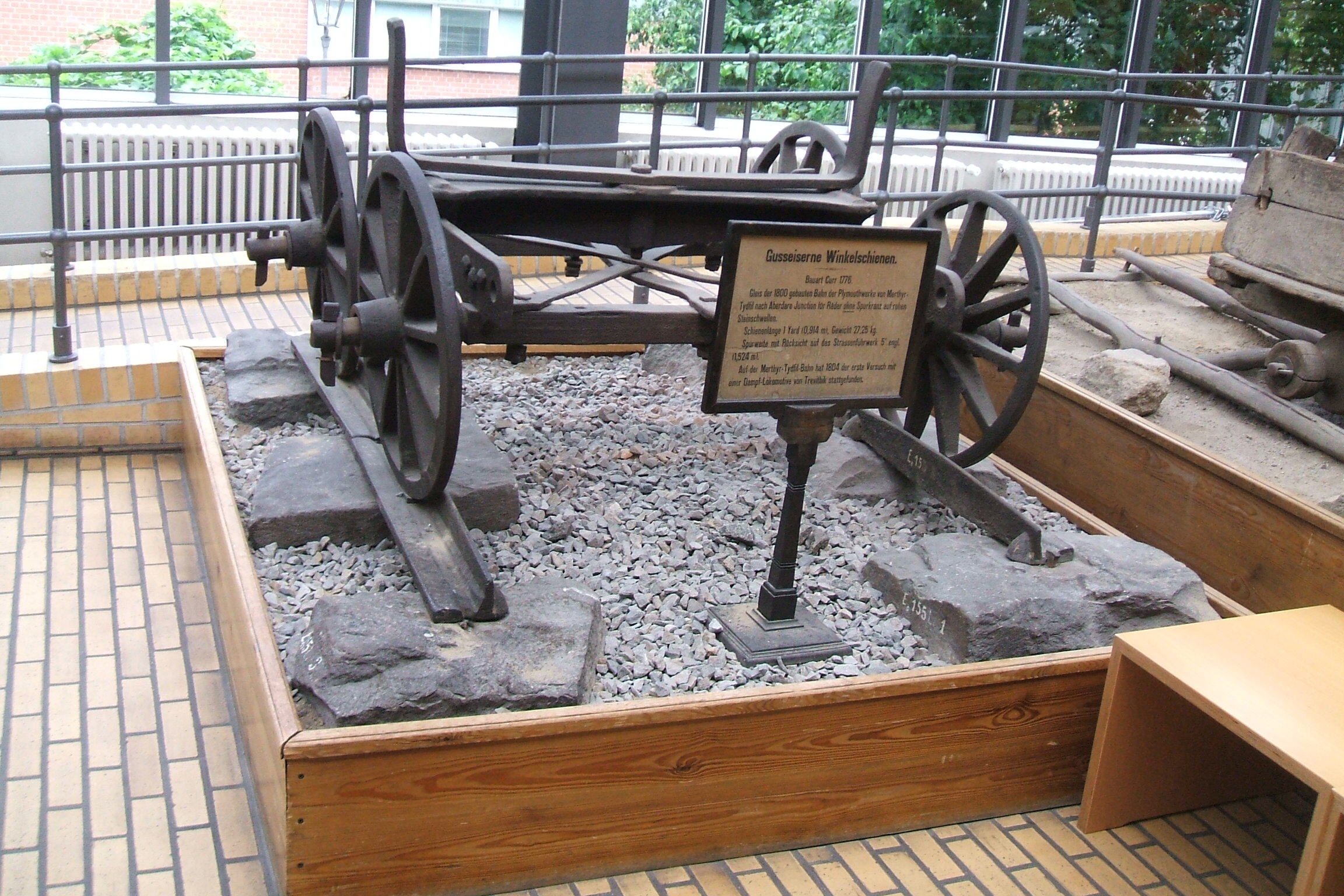
Section of L-shaped plate rails

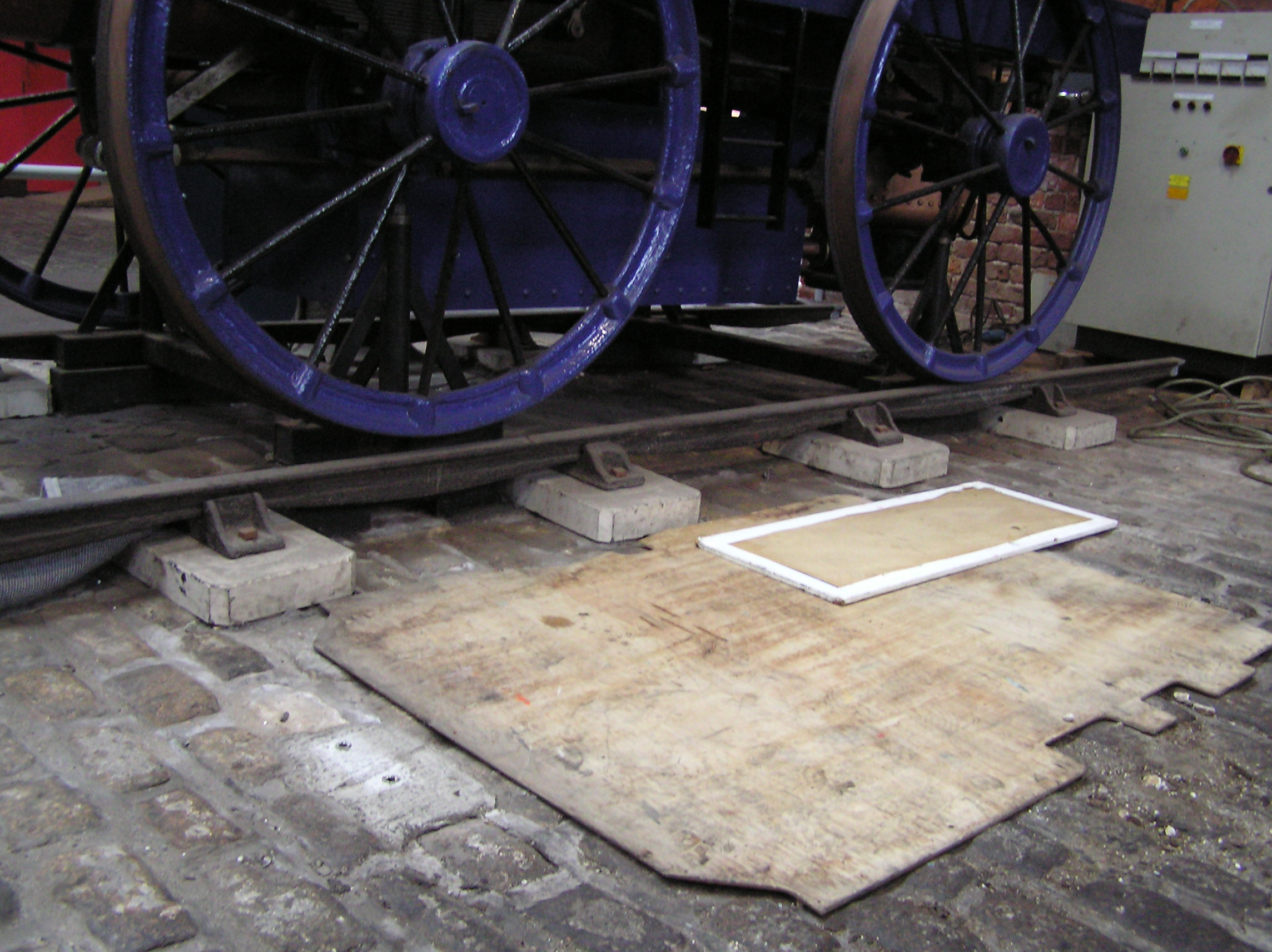
A long fish bellied rail supported over several chairs

An alternative was developed by John Curr of Sheffield, the manager of the Duke of Norfolk's colliery there. This had a L-shaped rail, so that the flange was on the rail rather than on the wheel. This was also used by Benjamin Outram of Butterley Ironworks and William Jessop (who became a partner in them in 1790). These were used to transport goods for relatively short distances down to canals, though Curr's ran between the manor colliery and Sheffield town. These rails are referred to as plates, and the railway is sometimes called a plateway. The term "platelayer" also derives from this origin. In theory, the unflanged wheels could have been used on ordinary highways, but in practice this was probably rarely done, because the wagon wheels were so narrow that they would have dug into the road surface.

The system found wide adoption in Britain. Often, the plates were mounted on stone blocks, and sometimes without sleepers, but that was liable to cause the rails to spread apart, increasing the gauge. Railways of this kind were widely used in south Wales, particularly to transport limestone down to the ironworks, and then to take the iron to a canal, sometimes several miles away, which took the products to market. The rails were at first made of cast iron, typically in lengths of 3 feet (0.91 m), spanning between stone blocks.

The stone blocks had been assumed to be permanent, but experience quickly showed that they settled and gradually moved under traffic, creating chaotic track geometry and causing derailments. Another problem was that the running surface was liable to become obstructed by stones, displaced from the ballast. An alternative was to use an iron tie bar to keep the rails to the proper gauge, incorporating a shoe in which the rail was fixed.

An example of this was the Penydarren or Merthyr tramway. This was used by Richard Trevithick to demonstrate a pioneer locomotive in 1804, using one of his high pressure steam engines, but the engine was so heavy that it broke many of the rails.

=== Early edge rails ===
Cast iron edge rails were used by Thomas Dadford Jr. when building the Beaufort and Blaenavon lines to the Monmouthshire canal in 1793. These were rectangular, 2.5 inches (64 mm) in width with a depth of 3 inches (76 mm) and 4 feet (1.2 m) in length, and required flanges on the wagon wheels. The same year, Benjamin Outram used edge rails on the Cromford Canal. T-shaped beams were used by William Jessop on the Loughborough-Nanpantan line in 1794, and his sons used I-shaped beams in 1813–15 on a railway from Grantham to Belvoir Castle. Samples of these rails are held in the Science Museum, London.

A short-lived alternative was the fish-bellied profile, first used by Thomas Barnes (1765–1801) at Walker Colliery, near Newcastle in 1798, which enabled rails to have a longer span between blocks. These were T-section edge rails, three feet long and laid on transverse stone sleepers. These were still made of cast iron.

=== Butt and lap joints ===
The earliest rails had square butt joints, which were weak and difficult to keep in alignment. George Stephenson introduced lapped joints, which maintained their alignment quite well.

== Modern edge rails ==
The breakthrough came when John Birkinshaw of Bedlington Ironworks in Northumberland developed rolled wrought iron rails in 1820 in 15 feet (4.6 m) lengths, as used for the Stockton and Darlington Railway. This was strong enough to bear the weight of a locomotive and of a train of wagons (or carriages) pulled by it. This marks the beginning of the modern rail era. This system was instantly successful, although some false starts took place. Some early rails were made in a T cross section, but the lack of metal at the foot limited the bending strength of the rail, which has to act as a beam between supports.

As metal technologies improved, these wrought iron rails were made progressively somewhat longer, and with a heavier, and therefore stronger, cross-section. By providing more metal in the foot of the rail, a stronger beam was created, achieving much better strength and stiffness, and a section was created similar to the bullhead rail section still visible today. This was expensive, however, and the promoters of early railways struggled with decisions about the appropriate weight (and therefore strength, and cost) of their rails.

At first, the rail section was almost symmetrical top-to-bottom, and was described as a double-headed rail. The intention was to invert the rail after the top surface had become worn, but rails tend to develop chair gall, an attrition of the rail where it is supported in the chairs, and this would have made running on the former bottom surface impossibly noisy and irregular. It was better to provide the extra metal on the top surface and gain extra wear there without the need to invert the rail at its half life.

Many railways preferred a flat bottom rail section, where the rails could be laid directly on the sleepers, representing a marked cost saving. Indenting of the sleeper was the problem; where the traffic was heavy, it became necessary to provide a sole plate under the rails to spread the load on the tie, partly vitiating the cost saving. However, in main line situations, this form found almost universal adoption in North America and Australia, and in much of continental Europe. The United Kingdom persisted with bullhead rail in main line use, with widespread introduction of flat-bottom rail only starting in about 1947.

=== Steel rails ===
The first rails made from steel were made in 1857, when Robert Forester Mushet remelted scrap steel from an abortive Bessemer trial, in crucibles at Ebbw Vale ironworks, and were laid experimentally at Derby railway station on the Midland Railway in England. The rails proved far more durable than the iron rails they replaced and remained in use until 1873. Henry Bessemer supplied 500 tons of steel blooms to the London and North Western Railway's rail mill at Crewe in 1860. Several other companies began producing steel rails in the following years. The transition to steel rails was hastened by the introduction of open hearth steelmaking. William Siemens set up his Landore steelworks partly to supply rail to the Great Western Railway. A boom in rail production followed, but a banking crisis in America slowed the rate at which railways were built there and orders to British rail producers. The British iron and steel industry went into a recession, which particularly affected the wrought iron sector. When demand for rails began to grow again, it was largely for steel rails, which were more durable than those of iron.

== Associated features ==
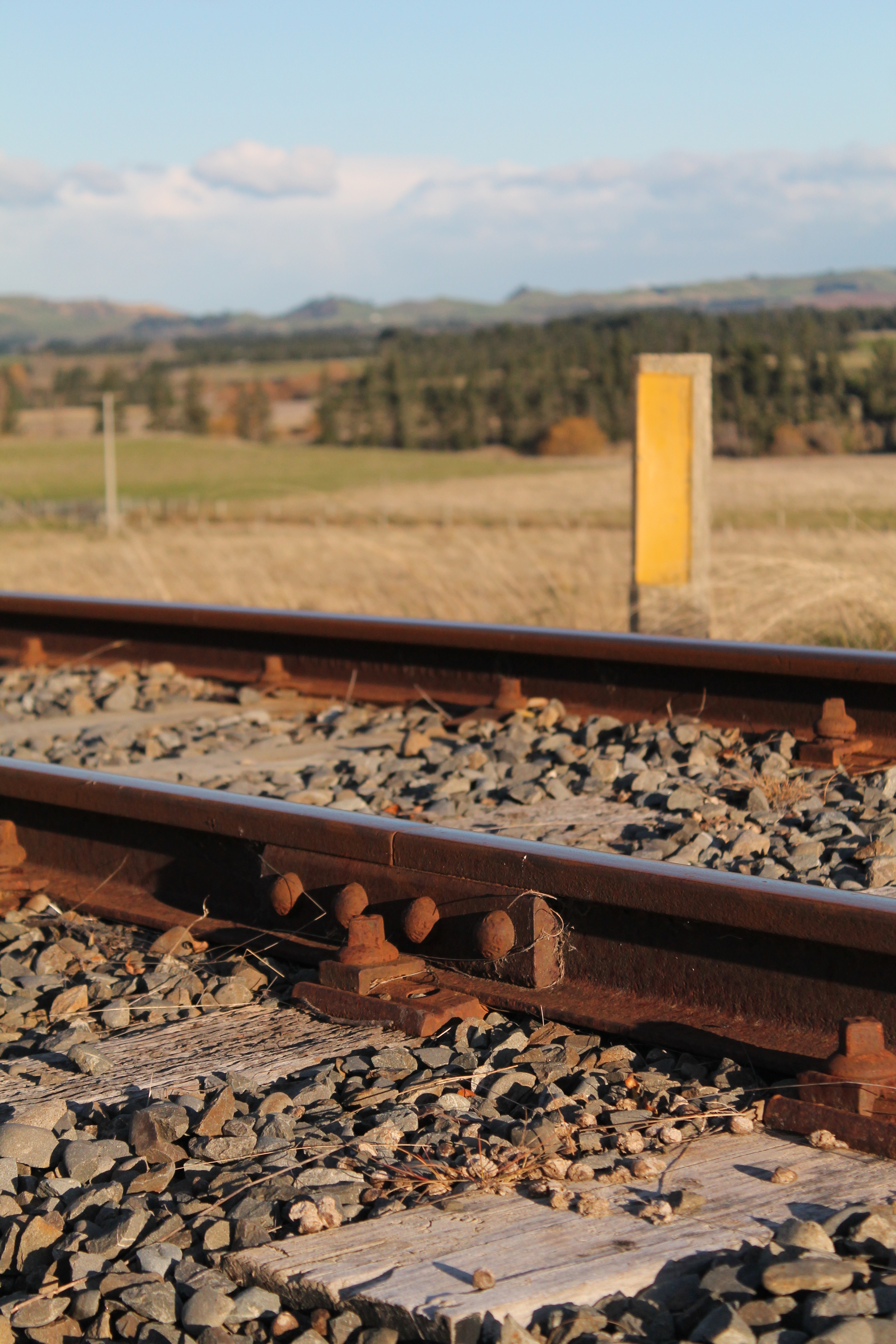
NZR Half Kilometer peg, 70 lb/yd track and track fishplate. Weka Pass Railway

=== Sleepers ===
Timber sleepers, that is transverse beams supporting the two rails that form the track, replaced the individual stone blocks formerly used. This system has the major advantage that maintenance adjustments to the track geometry did not disrupt the all-important track gauge. The alignment of the track could be adjusted by shifting the sleepers bodily, without loss of gauge. Softwood was widely used, but its life was limited if it was not treated with preservative, and some railways set up creosoting plants for the purpose. Creosote-treated hardwood is now widely used in North America and elsewhere.

By that time, relatively long (perhaps 20 ft or 6.1 m) wrought iron rails supported in chairs on timber cross-sleepers, were in use—a track form recognisable today in older track.

Steel sleepers were tried as an alternative to timber; Acworth writing in 1889 describes the production of steel sleepers on the London & North Western Railway, and there is an illustration showing rolled channel section (shallow upturned "U" shapes) with no shaped ends, and with three-part forged chairs riveted direct. However steel sleepers seem not to have enjoyed widespread adoption until about 1995. Their dominant usage now is for life extension of existing track on secondary routes. They have a significant advantage on weak formations and poor ballast conditions, as the bearing area is at a high level, immediately under the rail seat.

=== Rail fastenings ===
The early cast iron rails of the 18th century and before used integral fixings for nailing or bolting to the railroad ties. Strap rails introduced in the late 18th century, of cast and later rolled iron were nailed to wooden supports via countersunk holes in the metal. The introduction of rolled rail profiles in the 1820s such as the single flanged T parallel rail and later double flanged T parallel rail required the use of chairs, keys to hold the rail, and bolts or spikes to fix the chair. The flat bottomed rail invented by Robert L. Stevens in 1830 was initially spiked directly to wooden sleepers, later tie plates were used to spread the load and also keep the rail in gauge with inbuilt shoulders in the plate. Outside North America a wide variety of spring based fastening systems were later introduced in combination with baseplates and flat bottomed rail, these are now ubiquitous on main line high speed railways.

=== Ballast ===
Track was originally laid directly on the ground, but this quickly proved unsatisfactory and some form of ballast was essential to ensure good drainage, spread the load and retain the track in position. The natural ground is rarely strong enough to accept the loading from locomotives without excessive settlement, more so in wet conditions; a layer of ballast under sleepers reduces the bearing pressure on the ground, tends to keep them in place and resist displacement, and keeps the permanent way well-drained.

Ballast in early days was usually locally available mineral product, such as gravel or reject material from coal and iron mining. The Great North of Scotland Railway used rounded river gravel, which does not constrain movement as much as sharp-edged stone. In later years slag, a by-product of steel making, and ash from steam locomotives was used. Modern practice is to employ sharp-edged stone crushed within a narrow size range.

== Gauges ==
=== Early track gauges ===
The early railways were almost exclusively local concerns involved with conveying minerals to some waterway; for them the gauge of the track was adopted to suit the wagons intended to be used, and it was typically in the range 4 ft (1,200 mm) to 4 ft 8 1/2 in (1,435 mm), and at first there was no idea of the need for any conformity with the gauge of other lines. When the first public railways developed, George Stephenson's skilful innovation meant that his railways were dominant and the 4 ft 8 1/2 in (1,435 mm) gauge he used was therefore the most widespread. As early notions of linking up different railway systems evolved, this gauge secured general adoption. It is more or less an accident of history that this gauge—which suited the wagons already in use at the colliery where George Stephenson had been an engine man—became the British standard gauge: it was exported to most of Europe and North America.

Reference is sometimes made to the "gauge" of ruts in stone roadways at ancient sites such as Pompeii, and these are often asserted to be about the same as Stephenson's gauge. Of course the ruts were made by the wheels of carts, and the carts were of a sensible size for horse-drawn carts prior to the industrial era, pretty much the same as the size of the pre-railway carts at the colliery where Stephenson worked: that is the only connection.

=== Broad gauge track ===
When Isambard Kingdom Brunel conceived the Great Western Railway (GWR), he sought an improved design for his railway track and accepted none of the previous received wisdom without challenge. The 4 ft 8 1/2 in (1.435 m) gauge had been fine for small mineral trucks on a horse-drawn tramway, but he wanted something more stable for his high speed railway. The large diameter wheels used in stage coaches gave better ride quality over rough ground, and Brunel originally intended to have his passenger carriages carried in the same way—on large diameter wheels placed outside the bodies of the carriages. To achieve this he needed a wider track gauge and he settled on the famous 7 feet (2.1 m) broad gauge. (It was later eased to 7 ft 0 1/4 in or 2.140 m). When the time came to build the passenger carriages, they were designed conventionally with smaller wheels under the bodies after all, but with a seven-foot track gauge the bodies could be much wider than on the standard gauge. His original intention to have the wheels outside the width of the bodies was abandoned.

Brunel also looked at novel track forms, and decided to use a continuously supported rail. Using longitudinal timbers under each rail, he achieved a smoother profile while not requiring such a strong rail section, and he used a shallow bridge rail for the purpose. The wider, flat foot also meant that the chair needed by the bullhead section could be dispensed with. The longitudinal timbers needed to be kept at the proper spacing to retain the gauge correctly, and Brunel achieved this by using timber transoms—transverse spacers—and iron tie-bars. The whole assembly was referred to as the baulk road—railwaymen usually call their track a road. Initially, Brunel had the track tied down to timber piles to prevent lateral movement and bounce, but he had overlooked the fact that the made ground, on which his track was supported between piles, would settle. The piles remained stable and the ground between them settled so that his track soon had an unpleasant undulation, and he had to have the piles severed, so that the track could settle more or less uniformly. A variant of the baulk road can still be seen today on many older under-bridges where no ballast was provided. The design varies considerably, but in many cases longitudinal timbers are supported directly on the cross-girders, with transoms and tiebars to retain the gauge, but of course with modern rails and base-plates or chairs. The longitudinal sleepers are somewhat similar to modern-day Ladder track.

The group of railways that had Brunel as their engineer were successful and the broad gauge track spread throughout the west of England, South Wales, and the West Midlands. But, as the British railway network spread, the incompatibility of the two systems became a serious blockage, as a wagon could not be sent from one system to the other without transshipping the goods by hand. A Gauge Commission was appointed to determine national policy. The Broad Gauge was technically superior but conversion of the standard gauge routes to broad would have meant reconstructing every tunnel, bridge and station platform, whereas universal adoption of the standard gauge only required the progressive conversion of the track itself. The broad gauge was doomed, and no further independent broad gauge lines could be built.

The existing broad gauge routes could continue, but as they had no development potential it was only a matter of time before they were eventually converted to standard. In the meantime, an extensive mileage of mixed gauge track was installed, where each line had three rails to accommodate trains of either gauge. There were some instances of mixed gauge trains being run, where wagons of each gauge were run in a single train. The legacy of the broad gauge can still be seen where there seems to be an unnecessarily wide space between station platforms.

== Twentieth century and beyond ==
=== 1900 to 1945 ===
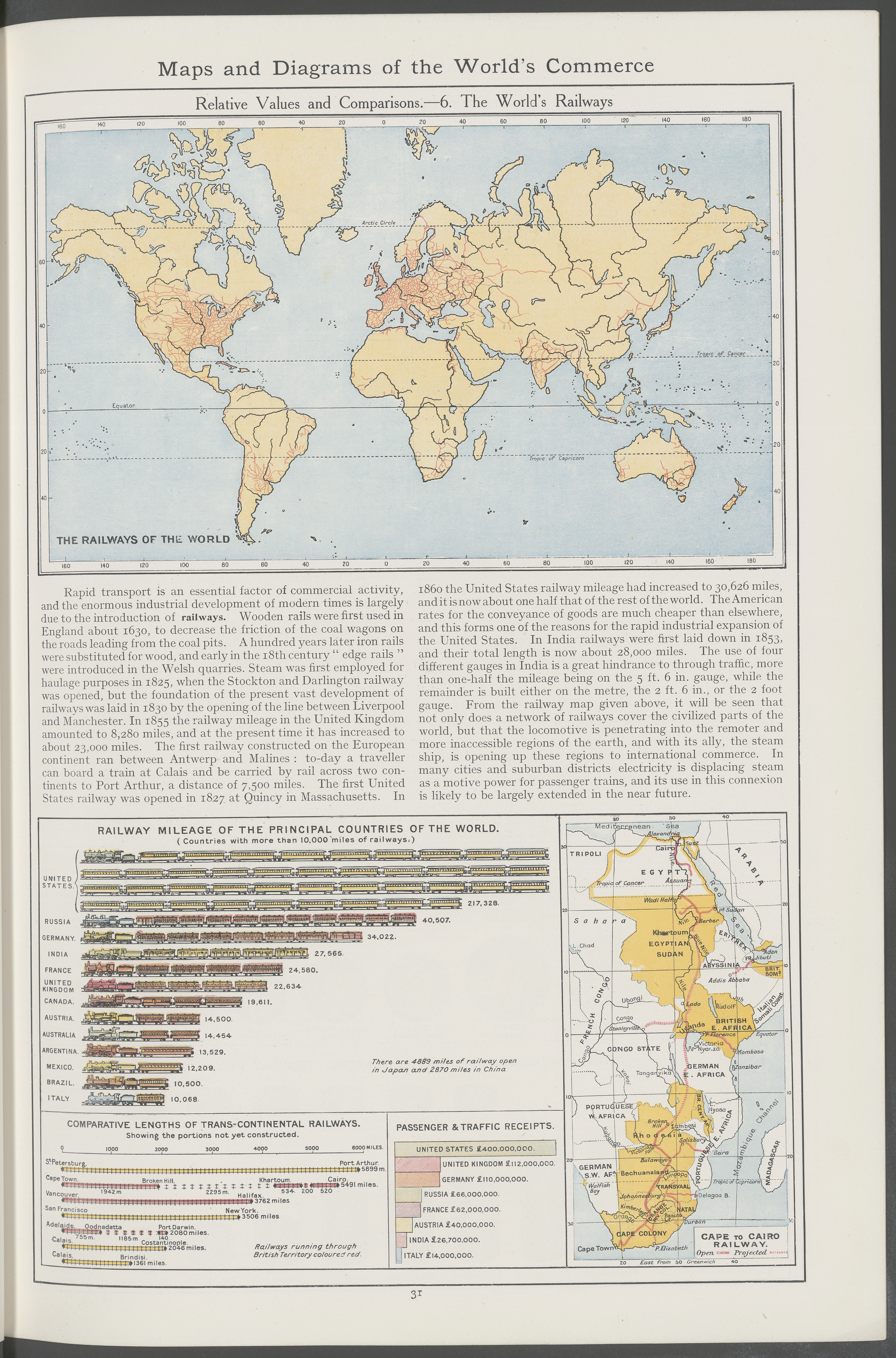
World's railways in 1908 as presented by The Harmsworth atlas and Gazetter

At the beginning of the twentieth century, the form of British track had converged on the use of wrought iron bullhead rails supported in cast iron chairs on timber sleepers, laid in some form of ballast. In North America, the standard was T-rails and tie plates fastened to timber crossties with cut spikes. Many railways were using very light rails and, as locomotive weights and speeds increased, these became inadequate. Consequently, on main lines, the rails in use were made progressively heavier (and stronger). Metallurgical processes improved and better rails, including some of steel, came into use. From a maintenance point of view, the rail joints were the source of most of the work, and as steel-making techniques improved it became possible to roll steel rails of increased length—reducing the number of joints per mile. The standard length became 30 ft (9,144 mm), then 45 ft (13,720 mm) and finally 60 ft (18,290 mm) rails became the norm. For main line use, the standard rail section became the 95BH section, weighing 95 lb/yd (47 kg/m). For secondary routes, a lighter 85BH, 85 lb/yd (42 kg/m), section was used.

Flat bottom rails were still seen as undesirable for British main line railway use, despite their successful use in North America, although some lightly operated British railways used them, generally spiked direct to the sleepers. Under heavy usage, they indent the sleepers severely and the incremental cost of a base-plate appeared at this early date, to rule the flat bottom section out.

Timber sleepers were expensive and not durable, and the railways’ engineers had strong—and conflicting—views about the best wood species and the best preservative treatments. The railways moved towards standardisation on a softwood sleeper preserved by pressure injection of creosote, measuring 8 ft 6 in (2.59 m) long by 10 in (250 mm) by 5 in (130 mm). Chairs were secured to the sleepers by trenails (steel spikes driven through a timber sleeve) or three chair-screws on first class routes. The GWR alone among the main line railways kept to its own standard, the 00 rail at 97.5 lb/yd (48.4 kg/m), and with two fangbolts securing each chair to the sleeper, with the head of the bolt under the sleeper and a nut above the chair—more secure but much more difficult to adjust.

Some experiments were made before 1945 with reinforced concrete sleepers, in most cases with bullhead chairs mounted on them. This was in response to the very high price of the best (most durable) timber, but reinforced concrete sleepers were never successful in main line use. Concrete pots were also used in sidings; they are sometimes called twin-block sleepers, and consisted of two concrete blocks each mounted with a chair, and an angle iron connecting them and retaining the gauge.

=== Post-war developments ===
At the end of the Second World War in 1945, the British railways were worn out, having been patched up following war damage without the availability of much new material. The country was economically in a weak situation also, and for nearly a decade after the war, materials—especially steel and timber—were in very short supply. Labour too was seriously restricted in availability.

The railway companies became persuaded that the traditional bullhead forms of track needed revision, and after some experimentation a new flat bottom rail format was adopted. The British Standard sections were unsuitable and a new profile, a 109 lb/yd (54 kg/m) rail, was made the new standard. In 60 ft (18 m) lengths, laid on steel baseplates on softwood sleepers, it was to be the universal standard. The fastenings were to be of a resilient steel type, and for secondary routes a 98 lb/yd rail was adopted. Regional variations still persisted, and hardwood sleepers and Mills clip fastenings were favoured on the Eastern Region, for example.

The new designs were successful, but they introduced many challenges, especially as the availability of experienced track maintenance staff became acutely difficult, and poorly maintained flat bottom track seemed more difficult to keep in good order than poorly maintained bullhead track. The greater stiffness of flat-bottom was an advantage, but it tended to straighten out between the joints on curves; and flat bottom’s rigidity led to high vertical impact forces at badly maintained joints and this resulted in high volumes of fatigue fractures at the joints. Moreover, the elastic rail fastenings had little resistance to rail creep—the propensity of the rails to move gradually in the direction of traffic, and the workload of pulling back the rails to regulate the joints was surprisingly high.

=== Long welded rails ===
Much of the work of maintaining the track was at the joints, especially as the stiff rails became dipped, and the joint sleepers took a hammering. Pre-war experiments with long welded rail lengths were built upon, and in the years from 1960 long rail lengths were installed, at first on hardwood sleepers but soon on concrete sleepers. For example, the first long welded rail (almost 1 mi or 1.6 km) on the UK's East Coast Main Line was laid in 1957, just south of Carlton-on-Trent, resting on rubber pads to resist rail creep. In this pioneering stage, some catastrophic mistakes in detailed design were made, but from about 1968 continuous welded rail became a reliable standard for universal installation on main and secondary routes. The form adopted used pre-stressed concrete sleepers and a 110A rail section—a slight improvement on the 109 rails previously used—the A was to distinguish it from the British Standard 110 lb/yd (55 kg/m) rail section, which was unsuitable. Rail fastenings eventually converged onto a proprietary spring clip made by the Pandrol company which was the exclusive form of fastening in Britain for about 30 years.

The welded track was to be laid on 6 to 12 inches (15 to 30 cm) of crushed stone ballast, although this was not always achieved, and the bearing capacity of the formation was not always taken into account, leading to some spectacular formation failures.

A further enhancement to the rail profile produced the 113A section, which was the universal standard until about 1998; detail improvements to the sleepers and ballast profile completed the picture and the general form of the track had stabilised. This format is now in place over 99% of the first-class main lines in Britain, although the CEN60 (60 kg/m) rail section was introduced in the UK during the 1990s. This has a wider rail foot and is taller than the 113A section so is incompatible with standard sleepers.

Track renewal trains have now replaced labour-intensive permanent way gangs. Long welded rail was hard to install manually. An early demonstration of mechanised track-laying with two 600 ft (180 m) lengths of long welded rail took place on the Fighting Cocks branch in 1958. The two lengths were loaded on ten wagons, attached to the existing track by a steel rope and drawn back at 30 ft/min (9.1 m/min). As the train moved back, the old rails were levered out and the new ones dropped into the chairs. A hoist on the rear wagon dropped the last part of the rail into place.

== Track gauge ==
As stated, the general track gauge in Britain was 4 ft 8 1/2 in (1,435 mm). In the later 1950s, general track maintenance standards deteriorated rapidly due to labour shortages and, on some routes, faster freight train speeds. Freight trains consisted almost entirely of short wheelbase (10 ft or 3.0 m) four-wheeled wagons carried on a very stiff elliptical leaf spring suspension, and these wagons showed a rapid rate of increase in derailments.

In response to the dynamic behaviour ("hunting") of the wagons, the permitted speed of the wagons was reduced to 45 mph (72 km/h) and, on new installations of continuously welded track on concrete sleepers, to reduce the track gauge by one-eighth of an inch to 4 ft 8 3/8 in (1,432 mm). In practice this change caused more problems than it cured and it was returned on renewals to 1435 mm with effect from 1996. The gauge is set by the positioning of the cast-in fixings, so it is not a simple task to re-gauge existing track; it also creates problems with spot replacement of sleepers. Many sleepers were made with the reduced track gauge but 1,435 mm (4 ft 8 1/2 in) standard gauge versions have also been manufactured in more recent times.

== Switches and crossings ==
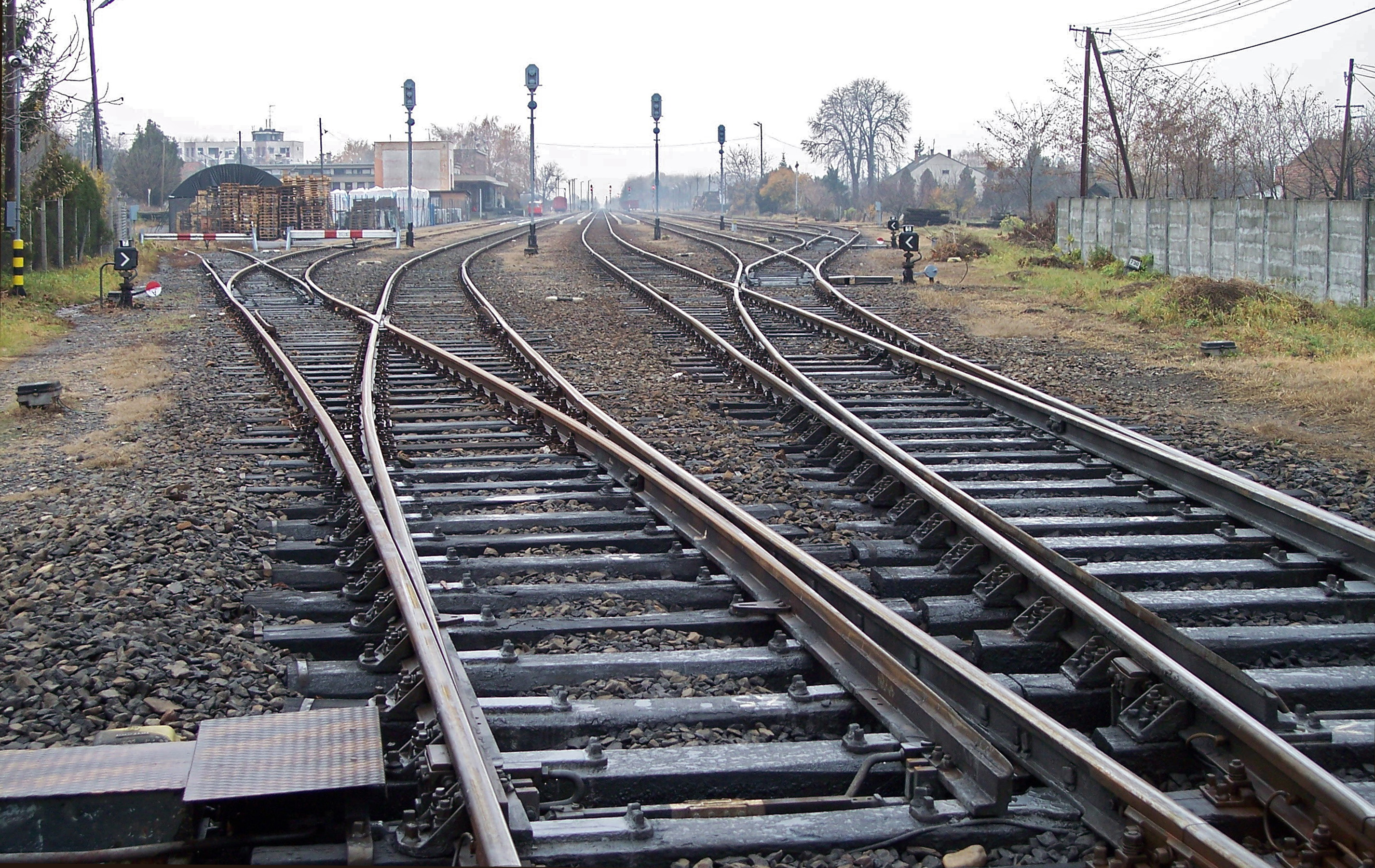
Railway turnouts

Terminology is difficult for "switches and crossings" (S&C) previously "points and crossings", or "fittings".

Early S&C allowed only a very slow speed on the subsidiary route (the "turnout"), so geometrical design was not too important. Many older S&C units had a loose joint at the heel so that the switch rail could turn to close to the stock rail or open from it. When the switch rail was closed, a reasonable alignment was secured; when it was open, no wheel could run on it so it did not matter.

As speeds rose, this was no longer feasible and the switch rails were fixed at the heel end, and their flexibility enabled the toe end to open and close. Manufacture of the switch rails was a complex process, and that of the crossings even more so. Speeds on the subsidiary route were rarely higher than 20 mph (32 km/h) except in very special designs, and great ingenuity was employed to give a good ride to vehicles passing through at speed on the main line. A difficulty was the common crossing where continuous support to wheels passing was difficult, and the point rail was planed to protect it from direct impact in the facing direction, so that a designed irregularity in support was introduced.

As faster speeds were required, more configurations of S&C were designed, and a very large number of components, each specific to only one type of S&C, was required. At faster speeds on the turnout road, the divergence from the main route is much more gradual, and therefore a very considerable length of planning of the switch rail is required.

About 1971, this trend was reversed with the so-called vertical S&C, in which the rails were held vertical, rather than at the customary 1 in 20 inclination. With other simplifications, this considerably reduced the stockholding required for a wide range of S&C speeds, although the vertical rail imposes a loss of the steering effect and the ride through new vertical S&C is often irregular.

== Continuous welded rail ==
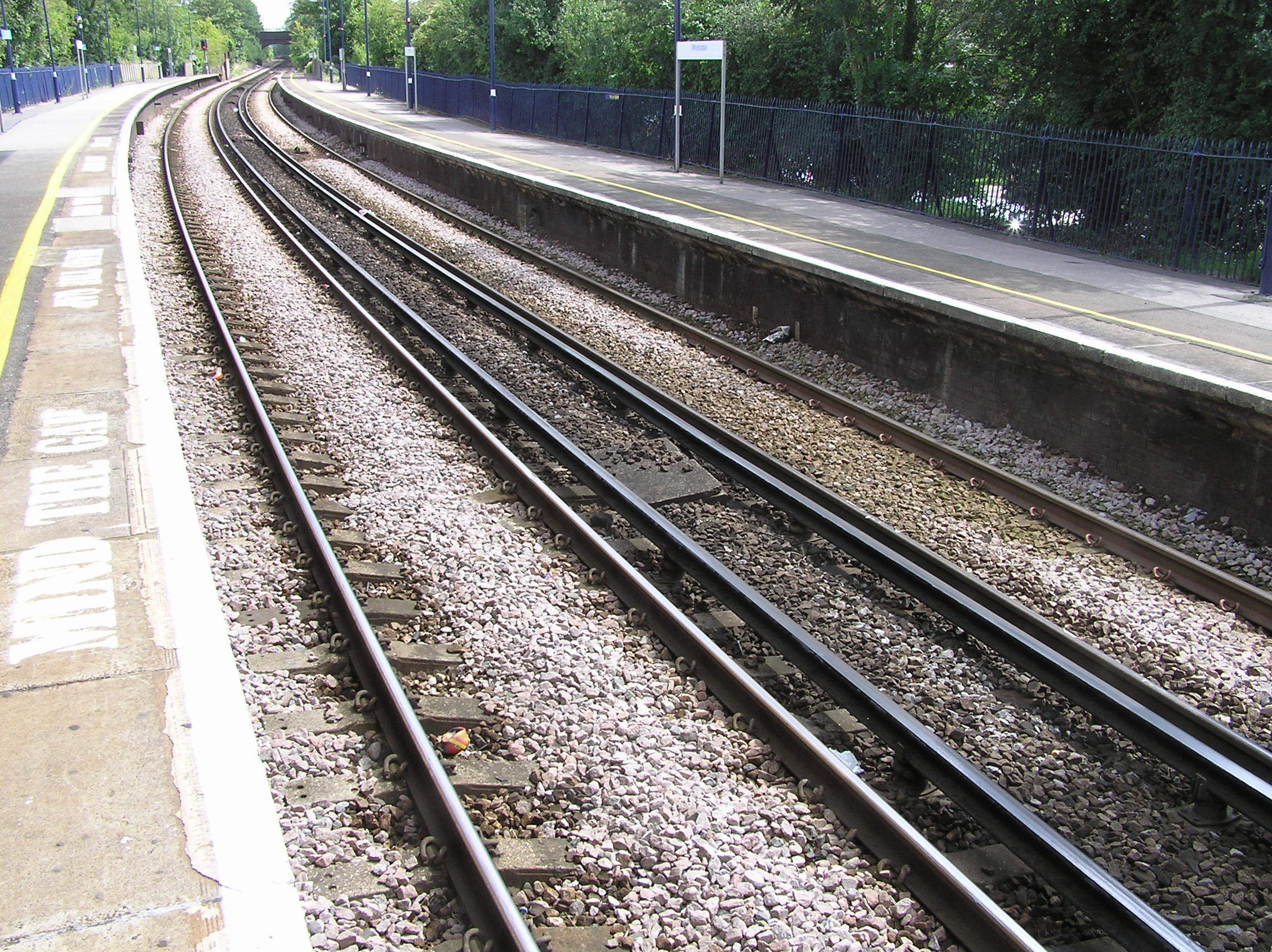
Continuous welded track with conductor rail installed in the 1970s

Continuous Welded Rail (CWR) was developed in response to the observation that the bulk of track maintenance work takes place at the joints. As steel production and manufacturing processes improved, the rail lengths installed were progressively increased, and the logical extension of this would be to eliminate the joints altogether.

A major obstacle to doing so is thermal expansion: the rails expand in higher temperatures. Without joints, there is no room for the rails to expand; as the rails get warmer, they will develop an enormous force in trying to expand. If prevented from expanding, they develop a force of 1.7 tonnes (17 kN) for every 1 degree Celsius of temperature change in a practical rail section.

If a small cube of metal is compressed between the jaws of a press, it will contract—that is it will be squashed somewhat—and a very large force can be resisted by it without ultimate failure. However, if a long piece of metal of the same cross section is compressed, it will deform sideways into a bow shape; the process is called buckling, and the compressive force it can withstand is very much less.

If the long thin piece of metal could be constrained to prevent it from buckling (e.g. by being contained inside a tube) then it can resist a much higher compressive force. If the rails can be constrained in a similar way, they can be prevented from buckling. The weight of the track resists buckling upwards, so buckling is most likely to take place laterally. This is prevented by:

- providing heavy sleepers, that generate friction on the ballast bed
- ensuring that the sleepers are well supported on consolidated ballast to enable the generation of the friction
- providing consolidated ballast around the sides of the sleepers to provide additional friction
- heating the rails when they are installed and fastened in cool or cold weather, so that the expansion on the hottest days is less than otherwise
- making sure that any rail added if rail breaks during cold weather is removed before warm weather returns.
- making sure that curves do not line themselves inward during cold weather sufficiently to make buckling more likely when warm weather returns
- taking precautions when track maintenance work is performed in hot weather, and making sure ballast is sufficiently consolidated before full-speed operation is resumed.

If the rail is held so that it cannot expand at all, then there is no limit on the length of rail that can be handled. (The expansive force in a one-foot length of rail at a certain temperature is the same as in a mile or 100 mile length of rail.) Early continuous welded rail was installed in limited lengths only because of technological limitations. However at the end of the CWR section where it abutted older, ordinary jointed track, that track would be unable to resist the expansive force and the jointed track might be forced to buckle. To prevent that, special expansion switches, sometimes called breathers, were installed. The expansion switches could accommodate a considerable expansive movement—typically 4 in (100 mm) or so—in the end section of the CWR without passing the movement on to the jointed track.

The CWR is installed and fastened down at an optimum temperature, to ensure that the highest possible expansive force is limited. This temperature is called the stress-free temperature, and in the UK it is 27 °C (81 °F). It is in the upper range of ordinary outdoor temperatures, and the actual installation work tends to be done at cooler temperatures. Originally the rails were physically heated to the stress-free temperature with propane gas heaters; they were then rattled with hand bars to eliminate any binding, preventing even expansion, and then clipped down. Since about 1963 however hydraulic jacks are used to physically stretch the rails while they are supported on temporary rollers. By stretching the rails to the length they would be if they were at the stress-free temperature, then there is no need to heat them; they can just be clipped down before the jacks are released.

The CWR rails are made by welding ordinary rails together. For many years, rails could only be made in lengths of up to 60 ft (18 m) (18.288 m) in Britain, and the factory welding process made them into 600 ft (180 m), 900 ft (270 m), or 1,200 ft (370 m) lengths, depending on the factory. The process used was a flash-butt process in which high electrical currents are used to soften the rail end, and the ends are then forced together by rams. The flash-butt process is very reliable, providing that the factory ensured good geometry of the rail ends.

The long rails could be conveyed to site by a special train, and unloaded on to the ground (by chaining the end in position and pulling the train out from underneath the rails). The long rails had to be welded together (or to adjacent track) using a site welding process; and, after initial experimentation, the proprietary Thermit welding process was used. This was an alumino-thermic process in which a powder 'portion' was ignited; the aluminium was the fuel and a metallurgically appropriate composition of molten steel descended into the gap between the rail ends, contained in refractory moulds.

The original SmW process was very sensitive to operator skill, and as the welding was usually the final process before returning the track to traffic, time pressure was sometimes applied resulting in unwanted improper welds. The improved SkV process was less sensitive and over the years weld quality improved.

The issue of buckling is not restricted to CWR, and jointed track has suffered buckles in the past. The fish-plates at joints need to be removed and greased annually (the requirement was relaxed to bi-annually in 1993) and where this was omitted or where ballast conditions were especially weak, buckling took place in hot weather. In addition, if rails were allowed to creep, it was always possible that several successive joints might close up, so that the expansion gap was lost, with inevitable results at the onset of hot weather.

== See also ==
- Clearance car
- List of track gauges
- Loading gauge
- Overhead lines
- Rail gauge
- Rail lengths
- Rail profile
- Rail sabotage
- Railroad switch (points)
- Rail tracks
- Rail terminology
- Railway platform
- Strap iron rail
- Structure gauge
- Third rail
- Tramway track
