= Clip and scotch =

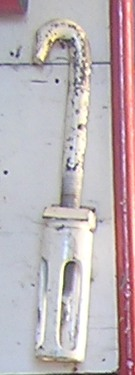
Point clip from Bungendore Railway Station

To clip and scotch a set of railway points (Amer. a switch) uses two pieces of equipment to temporarily lock a set of points into a particular position. The point clip clamps the end of a moving rail (the switch rail) of a set of points to its associated stock rail, and the scotch is a timber wedge used to ensure that the other moving rail is kept away from its associated stock rail. In this way the points are fixed in either the 'normal' or 'reverse' positions and cannot be moved by the usual setting mechanisms. For infrequently used points, this guards against mechanical failure of the points leaving them in a condition to derail trains. The 'clip and scotch' method can also be used to positively deny access to the turnout or mainline.

== Scotch block ==
A 'scotch block' is not used, as this is a different piece of equipment clamped to a rail used to ensure that stationary railway vehicles do not move, with much the same function as chocks used to keep aircraft stationary.

== Spike and wedge ==
In North America the term Spike and Wedge is used as instead of a clip, a rail spike is driven through a hole set in the metal base plate that is located flush up against the switch rail, holding it in place against the stock rail. The block of wood set in the open gap is known as the wedge and is functionally equivalent to a scotch.
