= Baulk road =

Railway track on undergirding timber bearings

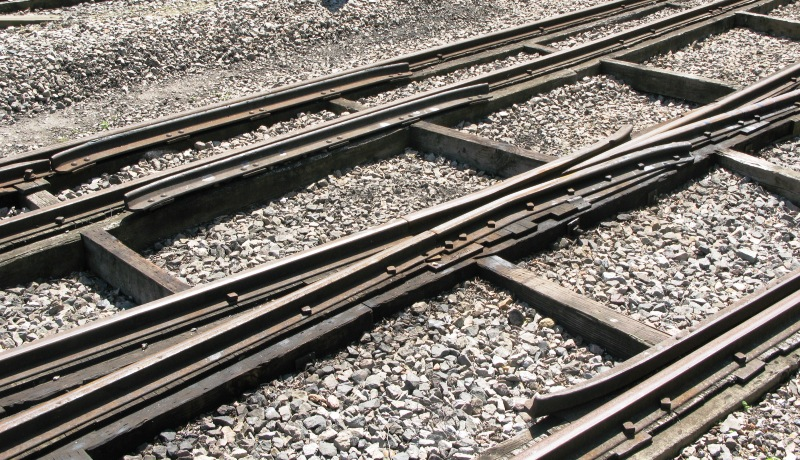
A baulk road crossing showing the baulks (under the rails) and transoms (to maintain the gauge)

Baulk road is the name given to a type of railway track or 'rail road' that is formed using rails carried on continuous timber bearings, as opposed to the more familiar 'cross-sleeper' track that uses closely spaced sleepers or ties to give intermittent support to stronger rails.

Baulk road was popularised by Isambard Kingdom Brunel for his 7 ft 1/4 in (2,140 mm) broad gauge railways in the UK, but has also been used for other railways and can still be found in modified form in special locations on present day railways.

== Development ==
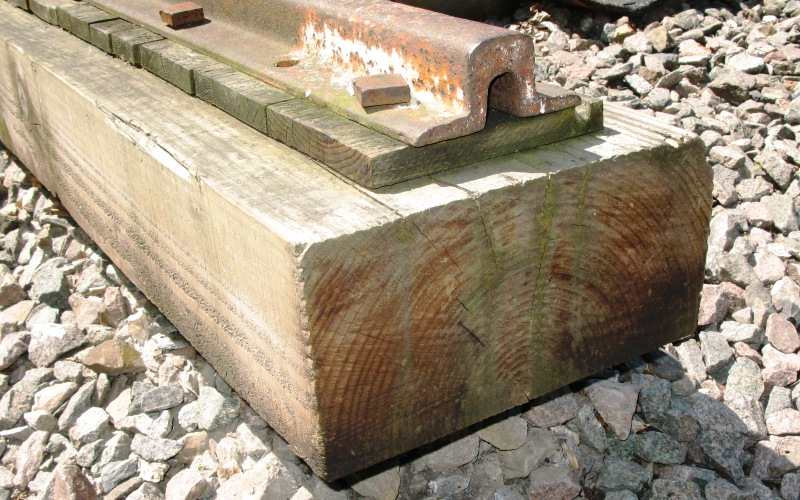
A section through a baulk with bridge rail on top

Brunel sought an improved design for the railway track needed for the Great Western Railway (GWR), authorised by act of parliament in 1835 to link London and Bristol.

He refused to accept received wisdom without challenge. The 4 ft 8 1/2 in (1,435 mm) gauge that had been adopted by most railways at that time had been fine for small mineral trucks on a horse-drawn tramway, but he wanted something more stable for his high-speed railway. The large diameter wheels used in stage coaches gave better ride quality over rough ground, and Brunel originally intended to have his carriages carried in the same way – on large diameter wheels placed outside their bodies. To achieve this he needed a wider track gauge and he settled on a 7 ft (2,134 mm) broad gauge but it was soon eased slightly to 7 ft 1/4 in (2,140 mm). When the time came to build the passenger carriages they were designed conventionally with smaller wheels under the bodies, but with the broad track gauge the bodies could be much wider than on the standard gauge. His original intention to have the wheels outside the width of the bodies was abandoned.

Early locomotive-powered railways had used short cast iron rails carried on stone blocks. A few were trying timber sleepers to support the rails and to maintain the gauge between them. These rails were brittle and broke easily, and they gave a rough ride due to the difficulty of maintaining a smooth line between the blocks or sleepers. Wrought iron rails were being manufactured but they were of poor quality due to the difficulty of cooling them evenly during manufacture. Brunel decided to use a continuously supported wrought iron rail, a bridge rail with a smaller rail section that cooled more evenly. This was an inverted-U section with wide flanges that could be bolted to the timber bearer, which was known as a 'longitudinal' baulk. The rail was usually kept off this by small wooden packing pieces that could be replaced when they were worn out by the passage of the trains, and therefore avoid the expense of replacing the heavier longitudinals. The rails were bolted to the longitudinals by long fang bolts or coach screws, and the rail joints were later supported by a base plate formed with a plug in the void of the inverted U shape rails so as to keep the rails in line with each other.

The longitudinal baulks, and therefore the rails, were kept to gauge by 'transoms' – transverse timber spacers – and iron tie-bars. The transom kept the longitudinals from getting too close together; the tie rods stopped them spreading too far apart. In later years the tie rods were replaced by strap bolts. These were bolted to the transoms and passed through a hole drilled through the longitudinal to a nut on the outside.

On the first section of the GWR, from London Paddington station to a temporary station at Taplow known as 'Maidenhead Bridge', Brunel had the track tied down to timber piles so that the gravel ballast (which was necessary on all railways for drainage) could be packed very firmly. It was packed so firmly, in fact, that the track was forced upwards between the piles and thus gave an undulating ride, just the thing that Brunel had tried to address by using continuous bearings and firm packing; cutting the piles away from the transoms solved the problem. The bridge rail for this line weighed 43 lb/yd (21.3 kg/m) but this was soon increased, generally to 62 lb/yd (30.8 kg/m). The longitudinal baulks were around 12 in (305 mm). wide and 5 in (127 mm). deep or 10 by 7 in (254 by 178 mm), but the sizes varied depending on the timber available and the weight of traffic to be carried. Transoms were around 6 by 9 in (152 by 229 mm) and initially spaced at 15 feet (4.57 m) intervals but this was reduced over time to around 11 feet (3.35 m).

The GWR also used conventional cross-sleepered track, especially on 4 ft 8 1/2 in (1,435 mm) standard gauge lines. Although its last broad gauge track was replaced by standard gauge in 1892, baulk road continued in service for some time afterwards. Converting broad gauge baulk road to standard was done by cutting the transoms and slewing the longitudinal and its rail to its new position. Between 1852 and 1892 an ever-increasing length of the Great Western Railway had been laid as mixed gauge that could be used by trains of either gauge. For baulk road this meant laying an additional longitudinal between the existing two (one rail was common to both gauges), but this significantly increased the cost and complexity of the track compared to cross-sleepers.

== Alternative systems ==
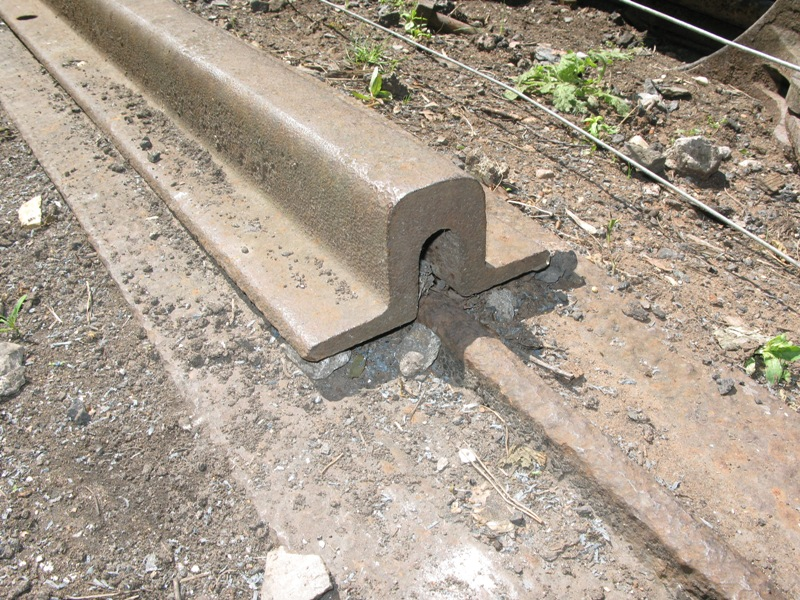
MacDonnell plate track

Vignoles rail was a light section that today would be classed as flat-bottomed rail. In its original form it was only about 4 inches (102 mm) deep and was used on baulk road interchangeably with bridge rail.

William Henry Barlow's Barlow rail was patented in 1849 as a purely metal road. Deep rails with an inverted, curved V section were designed to be laid directly into the ballast; gauge was maintained by iron tie bars between the rails. The rails weighed 93 lb/yd (46.1 kg/m) but this was later increased to 99 lb/yd (49.1 kg/m). They were used on lines such as the West Cornwall Railway, Wycombe Railway, South Wales Railway and New South Wales Railways. They soon fell out of favour as it proved difficult to pack the ballast properly. A large number were sold to the engineers building Clevedon Pier who bolted them together to use as girders. Other pieces of Barlow rail can occasionally be found in fencing near ex-GWR lines. Discarded samples found buried in ballast being recovered from the Didcot Newbury and Southampton Railway can be seen at Didcot Railway Centre.

The Bristol and Exeter Railway and the Bridport Railway used Brunel's bridge rail section but laid it on iron MacDonnell plates. These had three ridges to keep the rail in line and were laid directly into the ballast without any timber supports. It proved difficult to keep in alignment.

Seaton rail was similar to Vignoles rail but with the flanged foot angled down to give an inverted V section that was then used on triangular longitudinal.

== Other applications ==
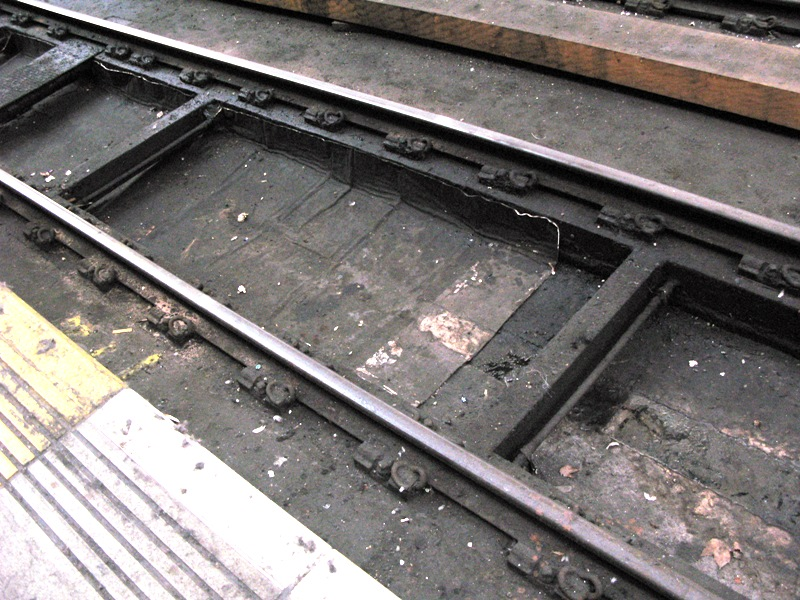
Modern baulk road at London Paddington station

Baulk road was used by John Coode for a number of 7 ft (2,134 mm) railways that he built as part of large construction schemes for harbour breakwaters at places such as Portland and Table Bay. The great widths between the rails and between the transoms allowed him to support the tracks on piles and discharge rocks from wagons directly between the rails to form the foundations of the breakwaters.

A variant of baulk road can still be seen today on some older under-line bridges where no ballast is provided. The design varies considerably, but in many cases longitudinal timbers are supported directly on the cross-girders, with transoms and tiebars to retain the gauge, and modern rails and base-plates or chairs laid on top. It can also be found in places where easy drainage is required or where access is required under rail vehicles for maintenance.

== See also ==
- Permanent way (history)
- Rail tracks
- Ladder track – generic term for longitudinally supported rails with gauge constraining transverse ties
- Slab track
