= International Association of Railway Operations Research =

Organization about railways

- Founded: June 8, 2005
- Type: Professional Organization
- Website: www.iaror.org

The International Association of Railway Operations Research or IAROR is an organization of academic and professional experts to facilitate the research in the quality of service, timetabling and safety of railway systems. It was founded in 2005.
