= Goods wagons of welded construction =

Goods wagons of welded construction (German: Güterwagen der geschweißter Bauart) were developed and built by the Deutsche Reichsbahn in Germany from 1933 to about 1945. With the introduction of welding technology in 1933 almost all wagon components were joined by welding and no longer by rivetting. This enabled goods wagons to be designed, for example, for higher speeds or for higher payloads through the use of different types of steel and other engineering changes, but their further development was so heavily influenced by the exigencies of the Second World War that, as early as 1939, the Deutsche Reichsbahn had to temper the design of goods wagons to the new economic circumstances. Because there were overlaps in the change from the Austauschbauart - goods wagons made with interchangeable components - to the new welded classes, the period of the changeover cannot be exactly defined. Several standard goods wagons and their classes are covered in other articles. Goods wagons built during the Second World War that were purely intended for military transport use, are covered under the article on Kriegsbauart - wartime classes.

As early as 1921 the development of goods wagons in the German states began to distinguish between those without special features, that represented the standard or norm, and those with certain characteristics i.e. that had a special equipment or properties.

Likewise the welded class of goods wagons were divided into:

- Goods wagons of standard construction (Regelbauart): standard goods wagons without special characteristics
- Goods wagons of special construction (Sonderbauart): goods wagons with special features

== Development history ==
Germany's goods wagons of Austauschbauart design, with their interchangeable components, were too expensively designed to continue to be economically manufactured. Consequently, the Deutsche Reichsbahn began to modify existing models or bring out new designs for all goods wagon classes, both from an economic standpoint and with regard to the increasing competition they faced in the transportation market from lorries. This led to a series of trials of various wagon types that got under way in 1932. The aim was to develop a series production in which the covered vans could be permitted to run at speeds higher than 65 km/h and open wagons would have a higher payload than 15 tonnes. The increase in maximum speed was necessary to enable goods wagons to be inserted in fast through trains as well as enabling goods wagons to be hauled within passenger trains. Through the introduction of various materials and production technologies, wagons could be produced more efficiently and the newly developed goods vans and trucks were continually developed and their designs optimised.

== Goods wagons of the standard type ==
=== Covered wagons ===
==== Ordinary covered wagons ====
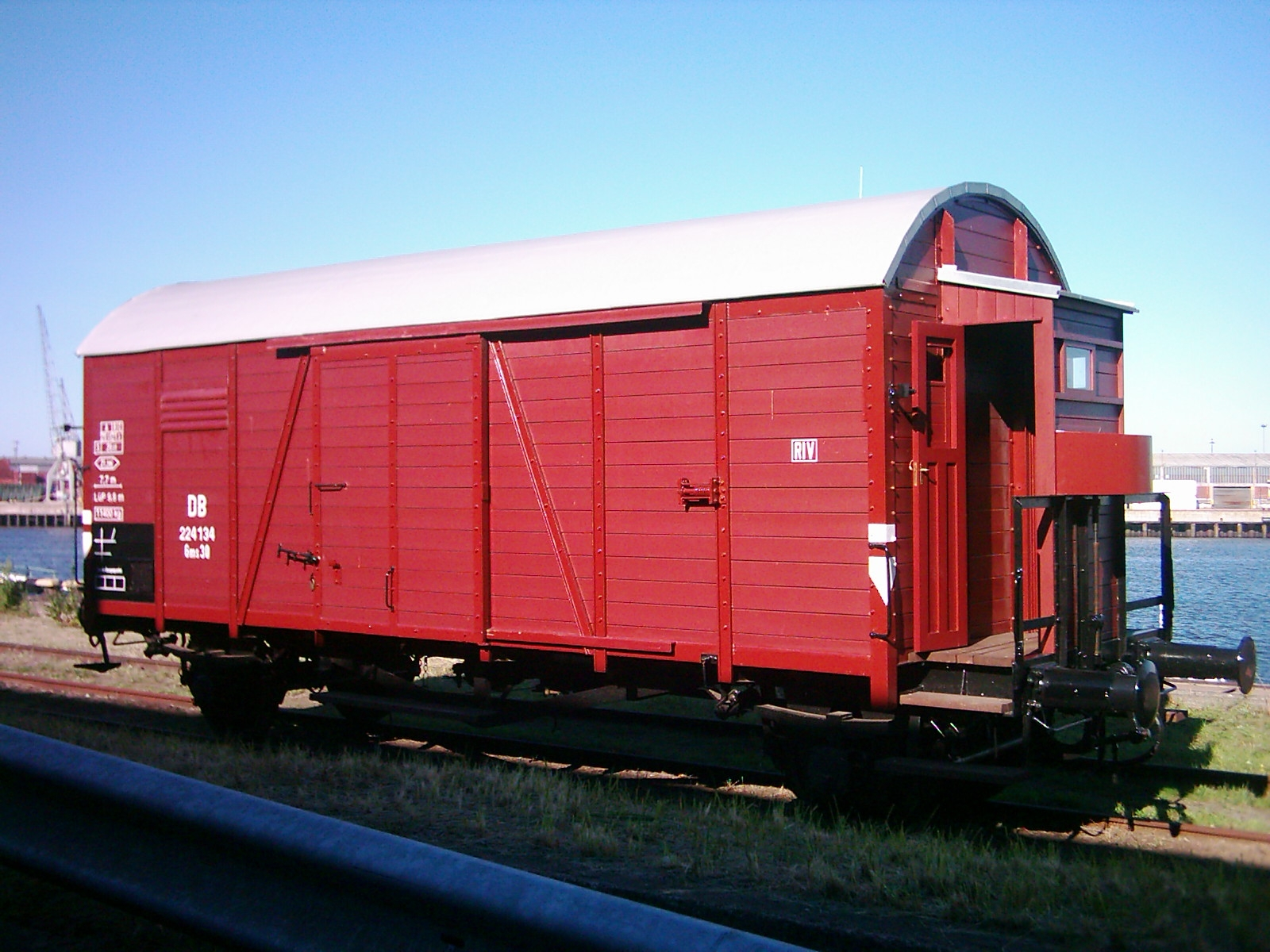
Covered wagon of the "Gs Oppeln" class

Category letters Gs, Oppeln class district

To meet demands for a faster part-load goods service, the high-speed "Gs Oppeln" class vans were built from 1937 in series. By designing it with a wheelbase of 6,000 mm, outer longitudinal beams and 7 leaf, 1,400-mm-long suspension springs the van was able to be rated for a top speed of 90 km/h. The wagons had no handbrake, a length over buffers of 9,100 mm, a loading volume of 45 m³, a payload of 15 tonnes and a carrying capacity of 17.5 tonnes. They had a pointed underframe (spitz zulaufendes Sprengwerk) and were fitted with a Hildebrandt-Knorr air brake.

This wagon class was built in several variants. For example, the first series of these vans were delivered as "Grs" i.e. able to be transferred onto the Russian broad gauge network. There were also variants with steam heating (Ghs) and with both steam and electrical heating (Gehs). The first trial wagons were built in 1934 in order to find an alternative to the Gr Kassel class. These goods vans were also known colloquially as "short Oppelns".

==== Large-volume covered wagons ====
Category letters Glhs, Dresden class district

Following the experience with the rivetted wagons of the Austauschart Glhs Dresden class, built in 1933, a completely new, four-wheeled goods van was developed: the welded "Glhs Dresden" (later informally known as the "long Oppeln"). The results with the prototype with its wheelbase of 7,700 mm and its leaf springs of 1,650 mm and 1,800 mm length had proved that very good, high speed handling had been achieved by changing the wheelbase and suspension springs. This resulted in a wagon with a length over buffers of 10,800 mm with a hand brake that was 2,000 mm shorter than the majority of large-volume goods vans.

This wagon had a wheelbase of 7,000 mm, a payload of 15 tonnes and, thanks to the 9 leaf, 1,800 mm long springs, a carrying capacity of 15.75 tonnes. Whilst the majority of large-volume goods wagons of the Dresden class had a loading area of 29.4 m², this van only had a loading area of 24.2 m². It had a barrel roof, and sliding doors over 2,000 mm wide, as well as plunger buffers and a Kunze-Knorr passenger train brake. Its loading length was only 8,720 mm, its loading width 2,780 mm and it was therefore wider than other large-volume covered wagons. All built wagons were equipped with steam heating pipes and rated for a top speed of 90 km/h. From 1934 to 1937 about 1,633 examples were built, all with hand brakes.

From Glhs Dresden to Ghs Oppeln

By increasing the specification of the loading area from 24 m² to 26 m² in 1937 the "Glhs Dresden" wagons, with their 24.2 m² of loading area, could be regrouped into the Oppeln class district and thus became the "Ghs Oppeln"

- Wagons with 1,650-mm-long springs

Category letters: Gls, Class district: Dresden
See also: Class: Glrhs Dresden

- Wagons with end doors

Category letters: Glt, Class district: Dresden

- Large-volume goods wagons for express trains

Category letters GGhs, class district Dresden

These eight-wheeled, large-volume welded goods wagons were built from 1934 onwards for insertion in passenger trains with a top speed of more than 90 km/h. These high capacity vans had two Görlitz type bogies with a wheelbase of 2,600 mm and 7-leaf springs. The bogies were a development of the Görlitz III light and Görlitz IV light passenger coach bogie types. The vans had a loading length of 15,520 mm, a length over buffers of 17,600 mm and hand brake. Their payload was only 15 tonnes, their carrying capacity 15.75 tonnes and their unladen weight 22.7 tonnes. They were fitted with steam heating pipes and, as express goods wagons, rated for speeds up to 120 km/h. In addition, they had an open brakeman's platform, plunger buffers and a Hildebrandt-Knorr passenger train brake. On either side of the van there were two 2,000 mm wide sliding doors and two ventilation hatches.

Because the undercarriage was based on that of passenger coaches, the external longitudinal beams were designed as a "fish" shape in order to provide strength due to their length. In 1935 the Deutsche Reichsbahn had three trial wagons, of which one had a barrel roof made of sheet steel, whilst the other two still had wooden roofs.

Category letters GGhs and GGths, Bromberg class district

The first four trials units of these eight-wheeled, large-volume "GGhs Bromberg" class goods vans were built in 1942. In 1944, several wagons of "GGths Bromberg" class followed. Their development was probably related to the transport of war materiel, because there was no actual requirement for this type of wagon and very few were built. They had a loading length of 16,620 mm, a payload of 51 tonnes, an unladen weight of 21.8 tonnes and a length over buffers of 18,000 mm. They were equipped with steam heating pipes and rated for a top speed of 120 km/h. They also had two 2,000-mm-wide sliding doors, three loading hatches and two ventilation hatches on each side of the van as well as Hildebrandt-Knorr brakes for goods trains (Hikg). Unlike the GGhs the GGths still had two end doors and was therefore also suitable for the transport of motor vehicles. With 75 units, it was the most built wagon of this class.

==== Lidded wagons ====
Category letter K, Wuppertal class district

Lidded wagons were used for the transportation of moisture-sensitive bulk goods such as lime or salt, but over the course of the years they were largely superseded by self-unloading hoppers. As a result the Austauschbauart class wagons built in 1933 were the last series of lidded wagons. In 1935 the DRG ordered only two welded trials wagons with a length over buffers of 9,100 mm without hand brakes and a wheelbase of 4,000 mm. The side walls were divided into two panels by a vertical brace on either side of the door. But this was not followed by a production run because lidded wagons, with all the associated difficulties of unloading, had meanwhile been technically superseded.

Category letter Kmr, Wuppertal class district

In spite of the disadvantages of lidded wagons, in 1940 a new design was ordered, but only eight trial wagons were produced. They had a length over buffers of 9,800 mm and had a hand brake, a loading volumen of 28.6 m³, a payload of 20 tonnes and a carrying capacity of 21 tonnes. Their most striking external features were the wheelbase of 6,000 mm, the external longitudinal beams and the brakeman's cab of steel with a semicircular roof. All the wagons were fitted with a Hikg brake and had eight roof hatches.

== See also ==
- German state railway norms – for German goods wagons before 1910
- Verbandsbauart – German goods wagons from 1910

== Literature and sources ==
- Eugen Kreidler: Die Eisenbahnen im Zweiten Weltkrieg – Studien und Dokumente zur Geschichte des Zweiten Weltkriegs, Nikol Verlagsgesellschaft mbh & Co KG, Hamburg, 2001
- Helmut Behrends, Wolfgang Hensel, Gerhard Wiedau: Güterwagen-Archiv Band 1, Transpress VEB Verlag für Verkehrswesen, Berlin 1989
- Janusz Piekalkiewicz: Die Deutsche Reichsbahn im Zweiten Weltkrieg, Transpress Verlagsgesellschaft mbH, Berlin, 1993
- Roger Gittermann: Kriegsbauarten. In: Eisenbahn-Magazin Heft 8/92, Alba-Fachverlag, Düsseldorf, 1992
- Walter Hollnagel: Eisenbahnraritäten – Von den zwanziger Jahren bis 1945, EK-Verlag, Freiburg, 2008
- Wolfgang Diener:Anstrich und Bezeichnung von Güterwagen, Verlag Dr. Bernhard Abend, Stuttgart, 1992
- WER: Die Reichsbahn-Güterwagen, Reichsbahn-Werbeamt für den Personen- und Güterverkehr, Berlin, 1939
- Deutsche Reichsbahn, Reichsbahn-Zentralamt Berlin, Dezernat 28: Die Güterwagen der Regelbauart, Berlin 1945
- Stefan Carstens, Rudolf Ossig : Güterwagen Band 1, Gedeckte Wagen, MIBA-Verlag, Nuremberg, 2000
- Stefan Carstens, Hans Ulrich Diener: Güterwagen Band 2, Gedeckte Wagen – Sonderbauart, MIBA-Verlag, Nuremberg, 2000
- Stefan Carstens, Hans Ulrich Diener: Güterwagen Band 3, Offene Wagen, MIBA-Verlag, Nuremberg, 2003
- Stefan Carstens: Güterwagen Band 4, Offene Wagen in Sonderbauart, MIBA-Verlag, Nuremberg, 2003
- Stefan Carstens: Güterwagen Band 5, Rungen-, Schienen- und Flachwagen, MIBA-Verlag, Nuremberg, 2008
