= Verbandsbauart =

Goods wagon or tram in Germany

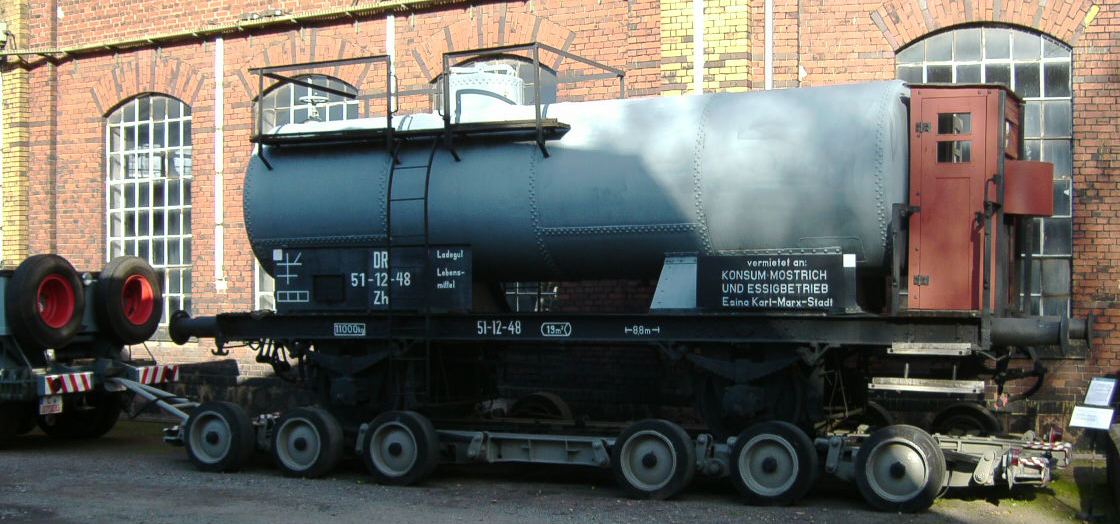
Tank wagon with standard underframe loaded on a Culemeyer

The German term Verbandsbauart describes both a type of goods wagon as well as a type of tram.

In order to standardise the goods wagons classes of the various German state railways (Länderbahnen), the German State Railway Wagon Association (Deutscher Staatsbahnwagenverband or DWV) issued regulations. The so-called Verbandsbauart (association) or DWV wagons, named after this association, were built from 1910 until the emergence of the Austauschbauart (interchangeable) wagons in 1927. Externally, the Verbandsbauart wagons looked very much like state railway goods wagons, but they were equipped for considerably higher maximum loads of up to 20 tons. A total of 11 classes were defined by norms defined by master engineering drawings (Musterblättern). The wagons were built in numbers that today are hardly conceivable. The most important ones were the A2 and A10 Class wagons of which over 100,000 of each type were built. The Om Class A10 wagons were, including wagons of identical construction made by other nations, the most widespread goods wagons of all time and formed the major part of the German goods wagon fleet until the 1950s. Only then did they slowly disappear from the tracks. Many were also modified as part of the German goods wagon reconstruction programme.

The other meaning of the term is used for one of the tram classes that arose after Second World War in West Germany. The Verband wagons succeeded the rebuilt, war-damaged trams and were built to guidelines issued by the Association of Public Transport Companies (Verband öffentlicher Verkehrsbetriebe, VÖV).

== Verbandsbauart goods wagons classes ==
=== A1 – Open wagon ===
The open wagon with drop-down sides of Class A1 were based on the Prussian truck, built to Sheet II ^{d}3. Just under 50,000 A1s were built from 1910, both with and without brakeman's cabs. They had a loading capacity of 18.4 m³, a maximum load of 15 tonnes and a carrying capacity of 17.5 tonnes. The wooden walls of the tiltable wagon were 1,000 mm high, the door width was 1,500 mm, the loading length 6,720 mm and the loading width 2,734 mm. The wheelbase for vehicles, with and without hand brakes was uniformly 4,000 mm, with a length over buffers of 8,800 mm.

As wagons of the DWV they bore the letter marking "Omk". Later when they were incorporated into the Deutsche Reichsbahn after the First World War, they were classified as "O Halle".

=== A2 – Covered wagon ===
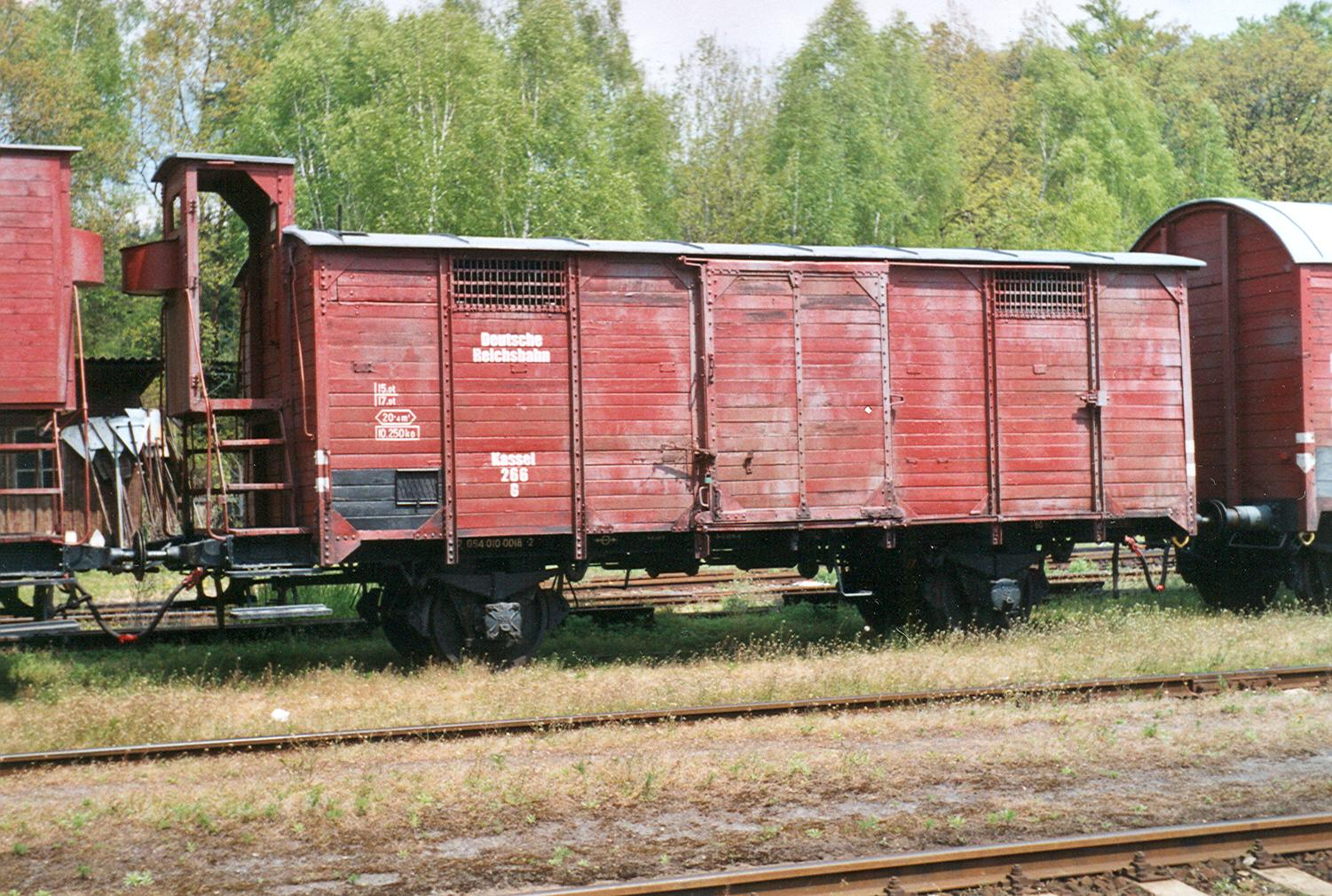
Class A2 covered wagon

The DWV built 120,000 Class A2 goods wagons from 1910 to 1927. These flat-roofed wagons were produced with and without hand brakes and in two variants of loading door and ventilation flap. One had a loading door and ventilation flap on each side; the other variant had two loading doors and two ventilation flaps per side. Later, most of the four-door variants were converted to two-door wagons as the extra doors were deemed superfluous. Vans with two ventilators were mainly used for transporting fruit and vegetables. The new raised brakeman's cab was given a gabled roof with a pointed ridge and handrails were added to the outside of the steps.

These twin-axle wagons had at a loading volume of 45.7 m³, a payload of 15 tonnes and a carrying capacity of 15.75 tonnes. The wheelbase was uniformly 4,500 mm, the length over buffers was 9,600 mm, it had pressed steel axle boxes and DWV wheelsets. The van had eleven-leaf, 1,100 mm long suspension springs. At one point of the wagon a Kunze-Knorr goods train brake was retrofitted from the mid-1920s. In the late thirties the end panels were reinforced by diagonal braces in order to better stabilize the van body when shunting.

Some of these vans were later converted to convertible wagons (Fakultativwagen) and equipped with the heating needed for passenger transport. In 1938, they were assigned to the "Karlsruhe" class with the letter marking "Gh" (DB: Gh 10; DR: Gh 04). But passengers were not allowed to travel abroad in these wagons or even board them in border stations.

As DWV vans they railway wagon association they bore the class letters "GM" or "NZ". Due to the high number of A2s, the Deutsche Reichsbahn had to create two or this type of wagon two "district classes" (Gattungsbezirke) for them: "Kassel" and "München" ("Munich") as well as the category letter "G".

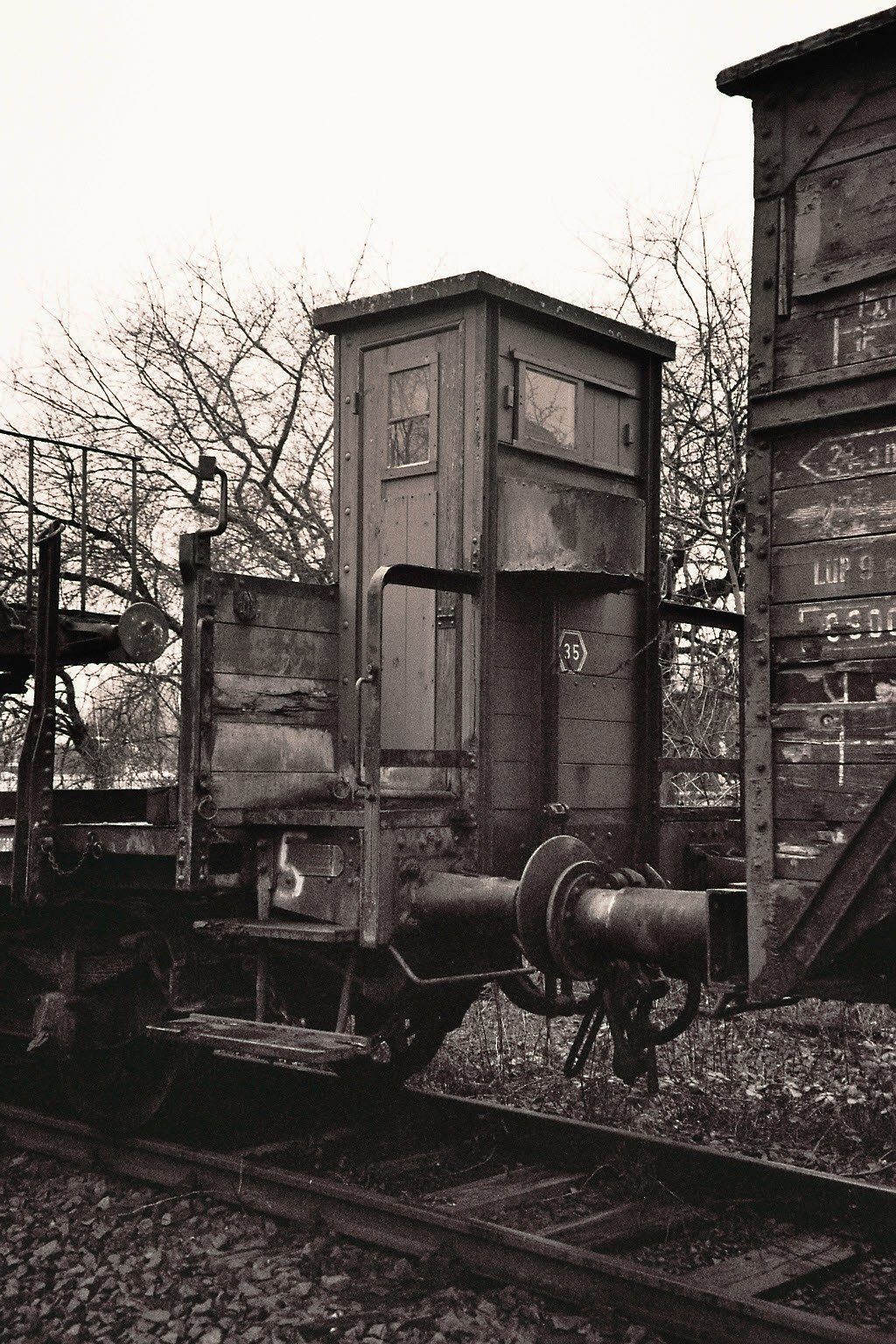
Brakeman's cab on a four-axle Class A3

=== A3 – Four-axled rail wagon ===
About 3,900 Class A3 rail wagons (Schienenwagen or Plattformwagen) were built from 1913 to 1925. These were a special type of flat wagon based on their Prussian forebears, based on Sheet II^{d}7. They were only built with brakeman's cabs and had a length over buffers of 15,800 mm, a loading length of 15,060 mm and a loading width of 2,750 mm. Their unladen weight was 17.4 tonnes, their maximum load 35 tonnes and their carrying capacity 36.75 tonnes.

They initially had two Diamond class bogies – later units had two pressed steel bogies – with a pivot pitch of 10,000 mm. These flat wagons had 12 folding stanchions made from riveted steel profiles, an underframe and Kunze-Knorr compressed air brakes.

The state railways gave them the letter marking "SSml", the Deutsche Reichsbahn grouped them into the "SS Köln" (Köln = "Cologne") class.

=== A4 – Stanchion wagon ===
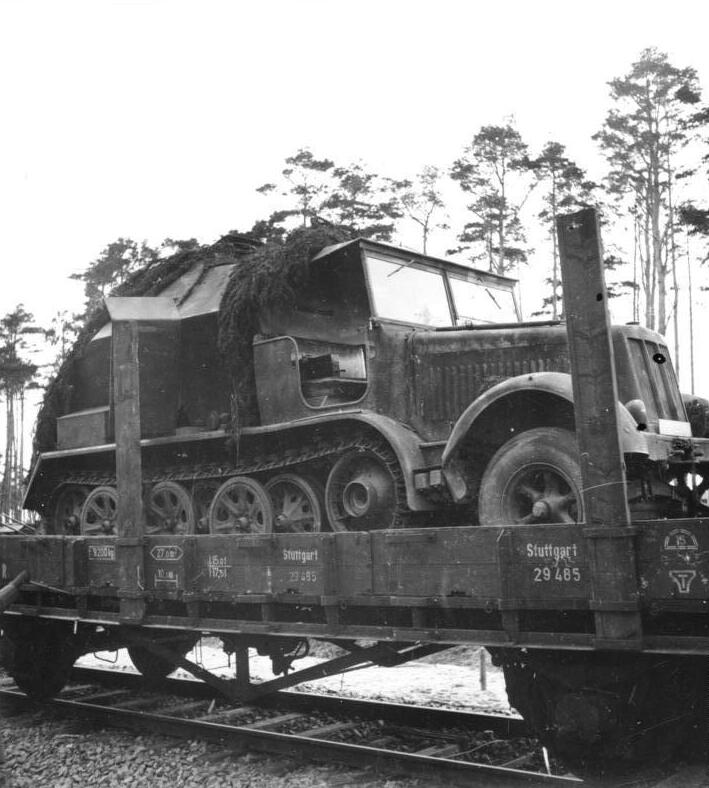
Class A4 stanchion wagon

The Class A4 stanchion or stake wagon (Rungenwagen) was built from 1913 to 1927 and was based on a Prussian design, Sheet II^{d}5. A total of about 35,000 were built, both with and without brakeman's cabs, the older series of wagons only had handbrakes fitted in the case of the variant with brakeman's cab and no brakes at all on the others. Not until the later series that were delivered to the Reichsbahn, were all the flats fitted with compressed air brakes. They were equipped with 18 wooden stanchions; after the war these were sometimes exchanged for pressed steel ones. The payload was 15 tonnes, they had an axle base of 6,500 mm, a loading length of 10,120 mm, a loading area of 27,000 m^{2}, a length over buffers of 12,200 mm with hand brake and a pointed underframe (spitzzulaufendes Sprengwerk). They were given the letter marking "Rm" by the state railways and later reclassified by the Deutsche Reichsbahn as "R Stuttgart".

=== A5 – Cradle wagon ===
In comparison with the existing state railway wagons, the cradle wagon (Drehschemelwagen), Class A5, had a longer wheelbase of 4,500 mm and was a new design. These wagons, used for the transport of timber, had eight stanchions and a rotating cradle that pivoted on a flat steel ring in the floor of the flat bed. All wagons built between 1913 and 1925 had a loading length of 8,000 mm, a loading width of 2,500 mm, a payload of 15 tonnes and a pointed underframe. The wagons without hand brakes had a length over buffers of 9,300 mm, and their unladen weight was 9.5 tonnes. Wagons with hand brakes had a length over buffers of 10,030 mm and an unladen weight of 10 tonnes.

They were designated as "Hrmz" by the state railways, but later grouped into the "H Regensburg" class by the Deutsche Reichsbahn. They were deployed for the transport of logs, construction timber and steel beams. Because, in later years, many of the Verbandsbauart cradle wagons were no longer needed, several were converted into railway departmental wagons and used for the transport of sections of track. Others had their cradles removed and became works wagons within the "X Erfurt" group.

=== A6 – Coal truck ===
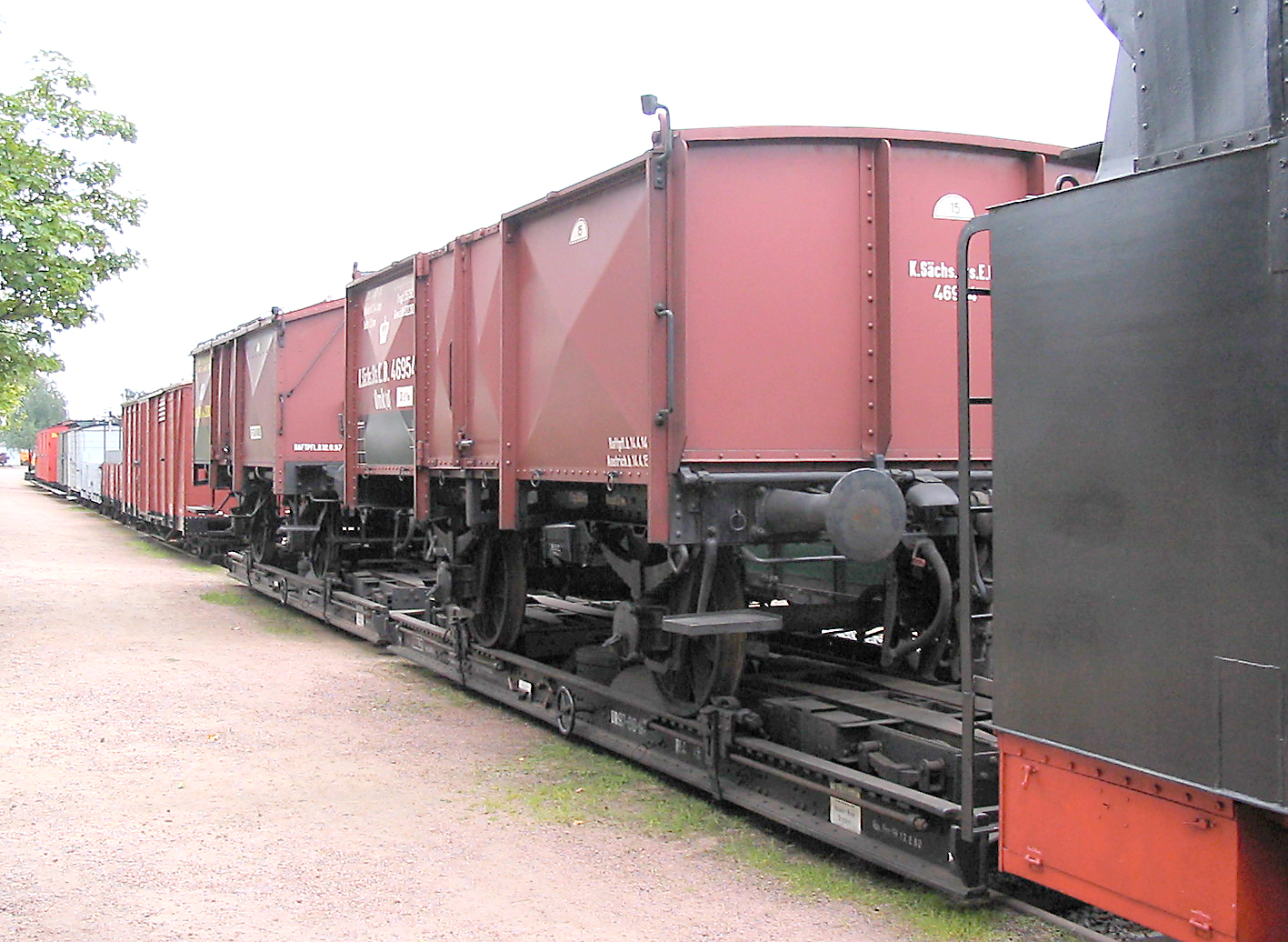
Class A6 coal truck

The Class A6 open wagons were based on Prussian Sheet II^{d}1. This truck was built from 1913, had steel sides and was built with and without hand brakes. The end wall was rotatable and enabled the truck to be unloaded at tipping facilities. They had a loading length of 5,300 mm, a loading width of 2,812 mm, a loading volume of 19.4 m³ and its carrying capacity was 15 tonnes.

The wagons without hand brakes had a wheelbase of 3,000 mm, a length over buffers of 6,600 mm and their unladen weight was 7.3 tonnes. The open wagons with a brakeman's cab had a wheelbase of 3,300 mm, their length over buffers was 7,300 mm and their unladen weight was 8.6 tonnes.

They were designated as "Omk[u]" by the state railways and give the classification "O Nürnberg" (Nürnberg = "Nuremberg") by the Deutsche Reichsbahn, whilst the Prussian coal truck built to Sheet II^{d}1 was grouped as "O Schwerin" in the DR. Many of these wagons were used as slag or coal trucks exclusively to support the engine sheds or Bahnbetriebswerke.

=== A7 – Lidded wagon ===
The twin-axled, Class A7, lidded wagon (Klappdeckelwagen) was built from 1913 for the transportation of hygroscopic bulk commodities and were very similar to the lime truck based on Sheet II^{d}4. They differed, however, in not having the upper door handle, steps and body struts on the longitudinal beams over the axle boxes. These trucks had a loading length of 5,295 mm, a loading width of 2,812 mm, a payload of 15 tonnes and a loading volume of 18.6m³. These enclosed wagons were so designed that the lids and side doors were very close fitting in order to protect the goods from sun and rain. The six lids were attached in the centre to the ridge beam that ran the length of the wagon and made loading easier.

The trucks without hand brakes had a length over buffers of 6,600 mm and, until 1917, a wheelbase of 3,000 mm and unladen weight of 9.5 tonnes. The wagons with hand brakes had an enclosed brakeman's cab, Kunze-Knorr brakes, a length over buffers of 7,300 mm, unladen weight of 10.3 tonnes and, until 1917, a wheelbase of 3,300 mm. From 1918 the wheelbase for both variants was specified to 3,500 mm.

=== A8 – Livestock van ===
Roughly 2,000 Verbandsbauart livestock vans (Verschlagwagen) were built from about 1913 to 1927. They were largely the same as the Class A2 goods vans. For example, the Class A8 livestock vans of the Royal Saxon State Railways had their loading area being doubled by having a second deck. These vans with their raised brakeman's cabs, were given the standard designation "Vemgz" by the state railways. The DR grouped them as "V Altona", the variant with 4 decks (for geese) being given the additional index letter "g".

They had a wheelbase of 4,000 mm, a length over buffers of 8,550 mm, a loading area of twice 18.2 m^{2}, a payload of 15 tonnes and a carrying capacity of 15.75 tonnes.

The A8s built for the Prussian state railways had no hand brakes, but were fitted with a compressed air brake line (index letter "n") for insertion in passenger trains. They were given the designation "Venmz", and later grouped by the DR into the "V Altona" class. These wagons had a length over buffers of 8,250 mm, a payload of 15 tonnes and a carrying capacity of 15.75 tonnes. Their wheelbase was also 4,000 mm and they had ten-leaved, 1,100-mm-long suspension springs.

The wagon bodies of these goods vans were made of wooden boards and fitted with additional loading hatches and feed openings. In the late 1930s these flat-roofed goods vehicles were fitted with welded braces in the end panels to reinforces the side walls. With the incorporation of Altona into Hamburg the district class changed in 1937 from Altona to Hamburg.

=== A9 – Large-volume covered wagon ===
The Class A9 covered wagons were designed for the transportation of weather-sensitive, light, large-volume or very long goods, such as furniture, automotive parts, decorative wood or large glass containers that, due to their volume, could not be moved in other goods wagons. Because their payload was only 15 tonnes the space in these wagons was almost never fully used.

Just like the large-volume, covered vans of the state railways the Class A9 were also called Hohlglaswagen ("container glass wagons"). This expression derived from the fact that the Prussian and Saxon statey railways had large-volume vans specially built for the transport of container glass.

The prototype for these Verbandswagen vehicles, roughly 6,000 of which were produced between 1914 and 1928, were the Saxon and Prussian state railway vans. Unlike the Class A2, with its raised brakeman's cab, the cab was set on the frame. These goods wagons were procured with and without cabs. The variant without a brakeman's cab was 12,100 mm long, that with a cab was 12,800 mm, both had a wheelbase of 7,000 mm and a payload of 15 tonnes.

The Reichsbahn grouped these wagons into the Dresden district class, with identification marking "Gl". Like the A2 covered vans the end panels were reinforced in the late 1930s with diagonal braces.

=== A10 – Open goods wagons ===
The Class A10 was an open wagon, newly designed in 1909 and built from 1913 to 1928. Over 200,000 of these trucks were built, the largest production run of a class of goods wagon in the world. Also described as an "open coke wagon", it was intended for the transportation of almost all not-hygroscopic goods, especially bulk goods such as coal, sand or agricultural produce.

The Deutsche Reichsbahn grouped them into classes Essen and Breslau, two series being needed because a single range of wagon numbers was not enough. As state railway vehicles they bore the letter marking "Ommk[u]" and in the Deutsche Reichsbahn "Om". In the DB, these trucks continued to bear the letter marking Om and class number (Bauartnummer) 12 until 1964.

The wagon body consisted of vertical steel profiles filled in with wooden planks, held together by a steel frame at the top. The body was reinforced with diagonal ties that ran from the top of the body to the bottom nearer the door. In the centre of the wagon was a pressed steel double door. The sides were 1,550 mm high. These wagons were built with and without a brakeman's cab, the cab where present being set directly on the chassis. The end walls folded down so that the truck could be emptied by tipping. These wagons were designed to a payload of 20 tonnes, had a carrying capacity of 21 tonnes, length over buffers 9,800 mm with brakeman's cab and 9,100 mm without. The wheelbase was standardised at 4,500 mm and the loading volumen was 33 m³.

=== A11 – Four-wheel rail wagon ===
The prototype for the Class A11 was the Prussian state railway vehicle built to Sheet Ce143. Just under 3,000 A11s were built from 1911 to about 1922. Despite its name, the rail wagon (Schienenwagen) was not usually used to transport rails, because by the end of the 19th century these were far too long for this type of vehicle. Instead it carried everything that was too short for a stake wagon, for example: casks, agricultural machinery, motor vehicles and chassis for export, wool, cotton and cork rind from the port railways.

This wagon class was only built without a brakeman's cab. It had a length over buffers of 14,400 mm and a wheelbase of 8,000 mm. It had end walls over 400 mm high, 12 removable steel stakes or stanchions and loading sleepers across the bed of the wagon. The truck was reinforced by an iron bar underframe, which enabled it to support a payload of 15 tonnes and a carrying capacity of 17.5 tonnes. Its loading length was 1,300 mm and its loading width 2,750 mm.

As state railway wagons they bore the letter marking "Sml" and, in the Deutsche Reichsbahn, they had the letter "S" and belonged to the Augsburg district class. Many wagons were given a welded steel profile underframe by the Deutsche Bundesbahn which enabled the payload to be increased to 20 tonnes (Sm 14).

=== Overview table ===
The following table gives an overview over several of the Verbandsbauart wagon classes. It is not feasible to show all classes with all possible subsidiary letters without the table becoming too long.

The "DWV" column gives the letter markings of goods wagons of the Deutscher Staatsbahnwagenverband from 1909 to 1921.

The "DRG" column displays the letter markings and district classification of the Deutsche Reichsbahn from 1924 to 1945.

The "DB" column shows the letter markings and class numbers used by the Deutsche Bundesbahn from 1951.

The "DR" column displays the identification markings used by the East German Deutsche Reichsbahn from 1951.

Standard Verbandsbauart goods wagons
Sheet number	Goods wagon type	First year of construction	Payload	DWV	DRG	DB	DR
A1	Open wagon (coal truck)	1911	15 t	Omk	O Halle	O 10	O 29
A2	Covered wagon	1910	15 t	Gm or Nm	G Kassel; G München	G 10	G 04; G 05
A3	Four-axle rail wagon	1913	35 t	SSml	SS Köln	SS 15	SS 65
A4	Stake wagon (large volume open wagon)	1913	15 t	Rm	R Stuttgart	R 10	R 61
A5	Cradle wagon (timber wagon)	1913	15 t ab 1913:18 t	Hrmz	H Regensburg (X Erfurt)	H 10 (X 05)	H 68
A6	Open wagon (coal truck)	1913	15 t	Omk[u]	O Nürnberg	O 11	O 31
A7	Lidded wagon (lime truck)	1913	15 t	Km	K Elberfeld from 1930: K Wuppertal	K 15	K 21
A8	Livestock van (small-livestock wagon)	1913	15 t	Vemgz; Venmz	V Altona from 1937: V Hamburg	V 14	V 23
A9	Large volume covered wagon (container glass van)	1914	15 t	Gml	Gl Dresden	Gl 11	Gl 12
A10	Open wagon (coke truck)	1913	20 t	Ommk[u]	Om Breslau; Om Essen	Om 12	Om 37; Om 36
A11	Twin-axle rail wagon	1911	15 t	Sml	S Augsburg	S 14	S 64

== Identification markings and livery ==
From about 1922, by order of the Reich Transport Ministry (RVM), almost all goods wagons were marked with the name of their owner, "Deutsche Reichsbahn", the name of a so-called "class district" (Gattungsbezirk), a wagon number ( wagonnummer) and a category letter (Category letters). The wagon bodies were painted in red-brown livery (paint number 11a,29), the wagon roofs in light grey (paint number 47) and the chassis, railings, etc., in a black colour (paint numbers 14,24,33). In 1927 the DR switched over to standard colours (Einheitsfarben) based on the Deutsche Reichsbahn's RAL colour system 840-B, see here too. From 1942, most of the wagons simply bore the letters "DR", the name of the class district, a wagon number and a category letter.

Standard colours → RAL colour number (840-B)

- Standard colour 11a → RAL 13 red-brown
- Standard colour 18 → RAL - pearl grey
- Standard colour 19 → RAL 2 light grey
- Standard colour 24a → RAL 1 white
- Standard colour 24b → RAL 6 red
- Standard colour 24c → RAL 24 yellow
- Standard colour 24d → RAL 5 black
- Standard colour 33 → RAL - pearl grey
- Standard colour 35 → RAL 5 black
- Standard colour 39 → RAL 1 white
- Standard colour 41 → RAL - yellow
- Standard colour 47 → RAL 2 light grey

=== Class districts of the Deutsche Reichsbahn ===
After the state railways had been subordinated to the sovereignty of the German Empire in 1920, the Reich Railway Authority began in 1921 to group all goods wagons with the same or similar roles into so-called "class districts" (Gattungsbezirke). These were given the names of German cities, usually those with the HQ of a Reich railway division. This method of classifying goods wagons was first used in 1912 when the Bavarian goods wagons were reclassified. The DR's goods wagon reclassification exercise began in 1922 and lasted until 1924. This did not just affect the Verbandsbauart goods wagons, but all goods wagons in the Deutsche Reichsbahn's fleet.

(S = State railway class; V = Verbandsbauart; A = Austauschbauart; W = Welded construction)

Class districts of the Deutsche Reichsbahn from 1921
Class districts	Category letters	Wagon type	Design	Period
Altona, later Hamburg	V	Livestock wagon	S, V, A, W	1922–1937
Augsburg	S	Two and three axled rail wagons	S, V, A, W	1922–1945
Berlin	Gk	Refrigerator van	S, V, A, W	1922–1945
Breslau	Om	Open wagon	S, V, A, W	1922–1945
Dresden	G und GG	Large-volume covered wagon	S, V, A, W	1922–1945
Elberfeld, later Wuppertal	K	Lidded wagon	S, V, A	1922–1930
Erfurt	X	Open departmental wagon	S, V, A, W	1922–1945
Essen	Om	Open wagon	V, W	1922–1945
Kassel (Cassel)	W	covered wagon	V, A	1922–1945
Köln	SS	Four and more axled rail wagons (flat wagons)	S, V, A, W	1922–1945
München	G	Covered wagon	Verbandsbauart	1922–1945
Nürnberg	O	Open wagon	Verbandsbauart	1922–1945
Regensburg	H	Cradle wagon	S, V, A	1922–1945
Stuttgart	R	Stake wagon	S, V, A, W	1922–1945

See also:

- Additional class districts from 1926
- Additional class districts from 1935
- Additional class districts from 1942

== See also ==
- History of rail transport in Germany
- Länderbahnen, the old state railways
- Deutsche Reichsbahn-Gesellschaft
- The table of standard state railway vehicles, which includes the 11 DWV wagons.

== Literature and sources ==
- Helmut Behrends, Wolfgang Hensel, Gerhard Wiedau: Güterwagen-Archiv. Band 1: Länderbahnen und Deutsche Reichsbahn-Gesellschaft. Transpress Verlag, Berlin, 1989, ISBN 3-344-00184-1.
- Walter Hollnagel: Eisenbahnraritäten – Von den zwanziger Jahren bis 1945. EK-Verlag, Freiburg, 2008, ISBN 978-3-88255-306-2.
- Wolfgang Diener:Anstrich und Bezeichnung von Güterwagen. Verlag Dr. Bernhard Abend, Stuttgart, 1992, ISBN 3-926243-11-2.
- WER: Die Reichsbahn-Güterwagen. Reichsbahn-Werbeamt für den Personen- und Güterverkehr, Berlin, 1939
- Stefan Carstens, Rudolf Ossig: Güterwagen Band 1, Gedeckte Wagen. MIBA-Verlag, Nuremberg, 2000, ISBN 3-86046-060-9.
- Stefan Carstens, Hans Ulrich Diener: Güterwagen Band 2, Gedeckte Wagen – Sonderbauart. MIBA-Verlag, Nuremberg, 2000, ISBN 3-86046-061-7.
- Stefan Carstens, Hans Ulrich Diener: Güterwagen Band 3, Offene Wagen. MIBA-Verlag, Nuremberg, 2003, ISBN 3-86046-074-9.
- Stefan Carstens: Güterwagen Band 4, Offene Wagen in Sonderbauart. MIBA-Verlag, Nuremberg, 2003, ISBN 3-86046-073-0.
- Stefan Carstens: Güterwagen Band 5, Rungen-, Schienen- und Flachwagen. MIBA-Verlag, Nuremberg, 2008, ISBN 978-3-89610-248-5.
- Deutsche Bundesbahn: 2812 Fuw 4/51, Nachtrag 18, Umnummerung der Güterwagen, der Dienstgüterwagen und der Bahndienstwagen der DB, sowie der bei ihr eingestellten Privatgüterwagen. Eisenbahn-Zentralamt Minden (Westf). Minden, 1952.
