= Austauschbauart =

German railway vehicles

The so-called Austauschbauart wagons were German railway vehicles produced from the late 1920s onwards which had common components built to agreed standards.

== Origin of the concept ==
The German term Austauschbau ('interchangeable component manufacture') is a manufacturing concept. The idea was initially used in the field of mechanical engineering, but is now the basis for industrial mass production techniques.

== Fundamentals ==
The basis of Austauschbau manufacture is that:

Any quantity of part 'A' produced at different times and in different places, must match any quantity of a similarly produced part 'B' without further finishing being required.

In short, it is a system of common, mandatory, standard production tolerances and fits that are specified for components, based on their function. To comply with the standards, special machines and tools are used that also meet precise tolerances. In addition, measurement tools and training are needed, to ensure compliance with the guidelines, both during manufacture and as part of quality control afterwards. Part of the principle is to design in as many standard parts as possible - screws, bolts, etc. - right from the concept stage. Austauschbau has enabled the division of labour and specialisation in modern industry, leading to economic mass production of complex machines, tools and vehicles.

== Identification markings and livery ==
From about 1921, by order of the Reich Transport Ministry (RVM), almost all goods wagons were marked with the name of their owner, "Deutsche Reichsbahn", the name of a so-called "class district" (Gattungsbezirk), a wagon number ( Wagennummer) and category letters (Gattungszeichen). The wagon bodies were painted in red-brown livery (paint number 11a), the wagon roofs in light grey (paint number 47) and the chassis, railings, etc., in a black colour (paint numbers 14,24,33).

In 1927, the DR switched over to standard colours (Einheitsfarben) based on the RAL colour system 840-B. From 1940, the livery colours were changed again, for example, from December 1941 the iron roofs of covered wagons were painted grey-black (RA 7021) and no longer in green-grey, and, from 1942, most of the wagons only bore the letters "DR", the name of the class district, a wagon number and a category letter.

=== Additional class districts ===
From 1921, all goods wagons with the same or similar functions were grouped into so-called class districts which were the names of German cities, mostly those in which there was a Reichsbahn divisional HQ. From 1926, the DRG introduced the following additional class districts:

Additional class districts of the Deutsche Reichsbahn from 1926
| Class districts | Category letters | Wagon type | Design | Period |
|---|---|---|---|---|
| Königsberg | O | Open wagon | Austauschbauart | from 1924 |
| Trier, later Saarbrücken | G, R, Gk | Ferry van | Austauschbauart | 1927–1935 |
| Wuppertal, formerly Elberfeld | K | Lidded wagon | State railways, Verbandsbauart, Austauschbauart | from 1930 |

== German Austauschbauart railway vehicles ==
From the mid-1920s, in the spirit of such interchangeable component manufacture, the Deutsche Reichsbahn began to use a greater number of standard parts. The idea was that, by specifying tight production tolerances, to enable the easy interchangeability of as many part as possible both within and between various vehicle classes, in order to make maintenance cheaper and easier. To that end the Joint Wagon Standards Committee (Allgemeine Wagennormungsausschuss or Awana), as well as the German Institute for Standardisation or DIN, developed the relevant norms. The construction of wagons to these principles began in 1927.

Whilst the various goods wagons that resulted are frequently classified as Austauschbauart wagons, when it comes to passenger coaches the term is only applied to the regular variants of the so-called 'thunderboxes' (Donnerbüchsen).

=== Standard goods wagons ===
The first Austauschbauart goods wagons were based on the extremely successful Verbandsbauart or DSV wagons. Of the original 11 types of DSV wagon, eight were standardised into Austauschbau versions and built in significant quantities. The two short open wagon (O) types were not longer up-to-date, so that no A6 wagons and only 32 A1 wagons were made. Also outmoded were the cradle wagons (A5) produced in a small batch of 26 units. Their role had been subsumed in the meantime by the eight-wheeled rail wagons (Schienenwagen) built in large numbers.

The wagons were initially fitted with Kunze-Knorr brakes. Several were built to be adaptable for Soviet broad gauge and designated with the letter secondary letter r. From 1933, the transition from rivetted to welded technology reduced the dead weight of the vehicles and increased the maximum load correspondingly. At about the same time the Hildebrandt-Knorr brake became standard, so that the majority of welded wagons were equipped with them.

In the middle of the 1930s, several types appeared with a longer axle base that enable faster running. Some of these wagons were equipped with steam heating pipes (secondary letter h) in order to enable their inclusion in passenger trains.

The numbers of Austauschbauart wagons never approached those of the DSV wagons because, to begin with, the worldwide economic crisis caused a reduction in the demand for transportation. Only with the start of the Second World War did the transport requirement rise again. As a result, the Oppeln (from 1937) and Stuttgart (from 1938) classes quickly became the most numerous Austauschbauart wagons built by far.

All these vehicles were of robust construction, in contrast with their successors the wartime wagon classes (Kriegsbauart), which meant that they remained in service with both German railway administrations for decades after the war without much modification.

=== Covered vans "G(r) Kassel", "G(r)(h)s Oppeln" ===
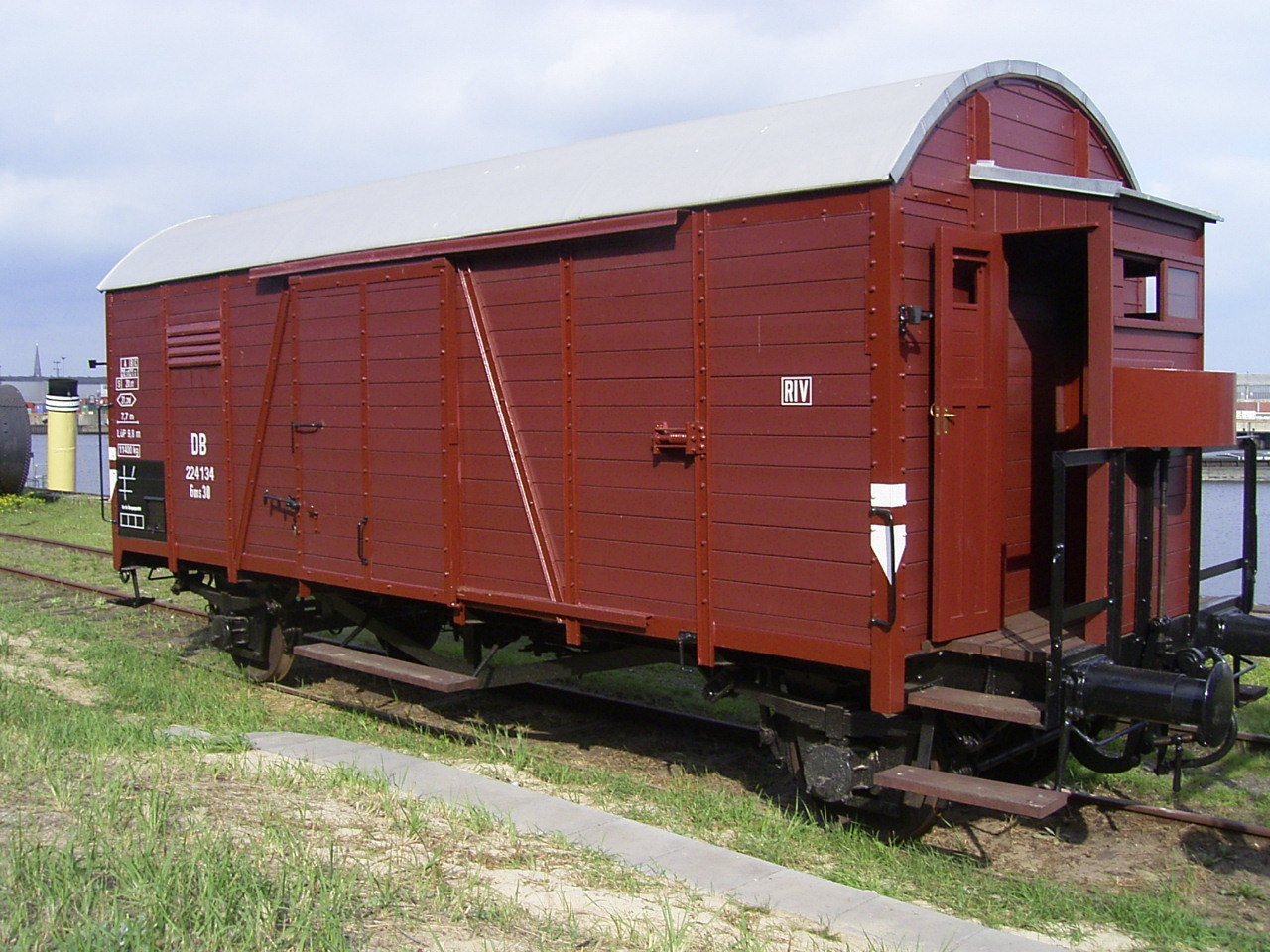
Late success: the "short Oppeln" built from 1937 rapidly became the most numerous Austauschbau goods wagon.

The covered vans of the Kassel class were based on the DSV's A2 wagon, the most striking differences being the use of a barrel roof instead of a flat roof and the brakeman's cab being located at floor level directly on the undercarriage rather than being elevated. The wagon body was stabilised by a diagonal reinforcing brace in the sections of wall next to the doors. In order to be able to use the undercarriage of the Om wagon (see below), the wagon body was shortened by 200 mm (7.9 in), so that the loading length was now only 7,720 mm (25 ft 4 in).

From 1937 the axle base was increased to 6,000 mm (19 ft 8 in) in order to give it better riding qualities; as a result the top speed could be set at 90 km/h (56 mph) (secondary letter s). These exclusively welded wagons were grouped into the Oppeln class. The "short Oppeln" was the most numerous Austauschbauart with 28,000 units being built. In contrast to the "long Oppeln", (see below), it had a triangular strut frame.

=== Eight-wheeled rail wagon "SSl(a) Köln" ===
This flat wagon, built from 1928, was longer and, at 40 tons, also had a higher maximum load than its Verbandsbauart predecessor based on technical drawing A3. The most obvious new feature was the fish belly girder. All wagons had a hand brake. On the welded versions which appeared from 1934 there was an open, foldaway brakeman's platform instead of the brakeman's cab (secondary letter a), in order to be able to transport longer loads over the ends of the wagon.

=== Stake wagons "R(r)(h) Stuttgart", "R(m)(r)s Stuttgart" ===
The Austauschbau stake wagon was 600 mm (2 ft 0 in) longer than the A4 DSV wagon, so that the undercarriage now matched that of the "Gl Dresden" (see below). Optically the wagons can be recognised easily by their trapezoidal strut frames. Most of the 1,600 or so wagons were fitted with wheelsets for transition to broad gauge. Between 1936 and 1938 about 1,200 welded wagons were built with three-dimensional, diagonal strut frames and without hand brakes. They were also fitted with Kunze-Knorr brakes, the only mass-produced, welded wagons to get them.

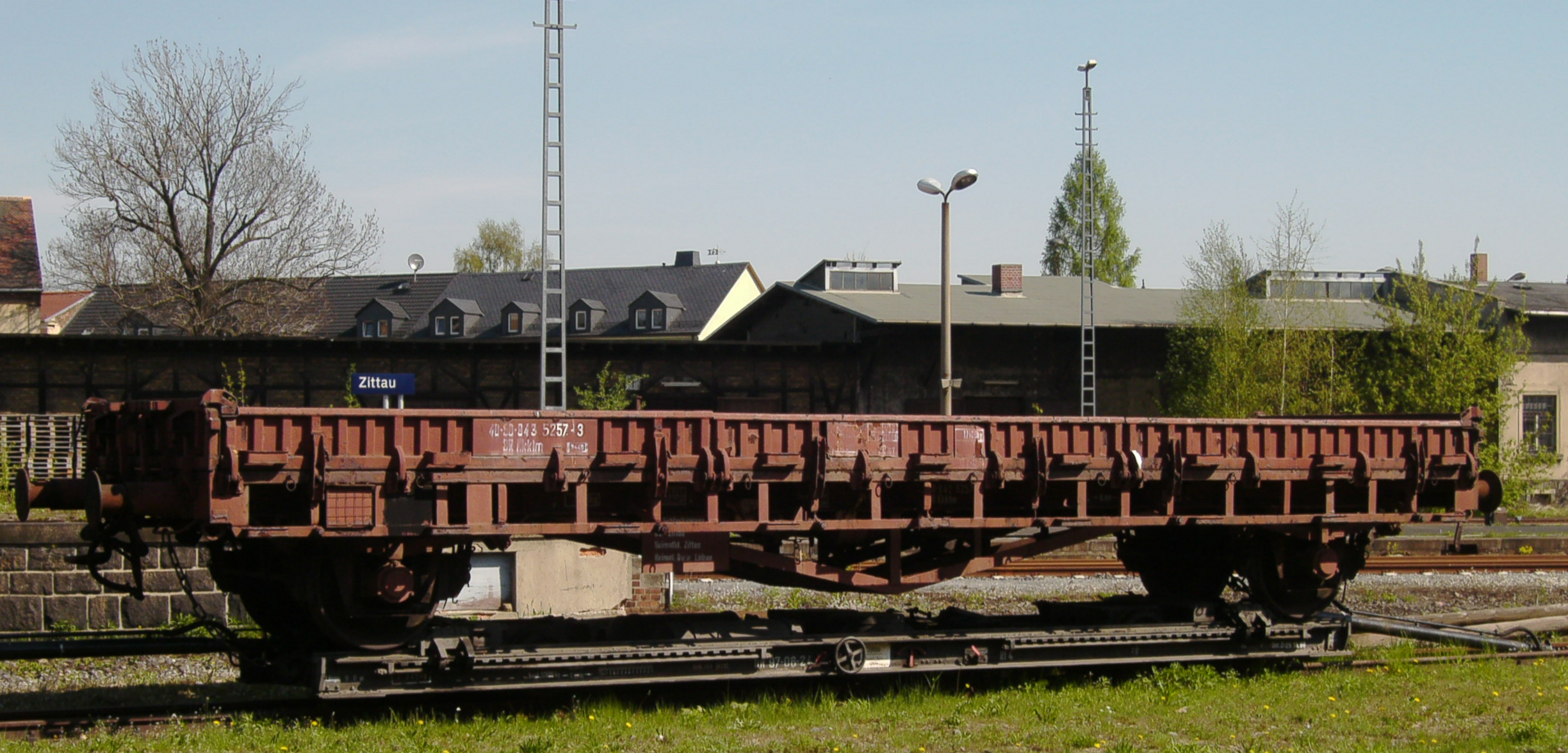
Rms Stuttgart with 8m axle base, after removal of stakes and waybill basket, finally used as a slag wagon

From 1938 the axle base was increased from 7,000 to 8,000 mm (23 ft 0 in to 26 ft 3 in) and the wagons equipped with a three-dimensional, diagonal strut frame again. This stable design enabled a top speed of 90 km/h and, from 1943, the maximum load to be raised to 20 tons (secondary letter m). The other design innovations were driven by the requirements of the Wehrmacht. For example, the end walls, made entirely from steel, served simultaneously as gangways and, as with the "SSla Köln" (see above), the brakeman's cab was omitted in favour of a folding brakeman's platform. For strategic reasons the secondary letter r was not, at first, written on the broad-gauge-compatible vehicles. Almost 24,000 of these robust vehicles were built up to 1943. In 1994 more than 1,000 examples entered the DB AG, not being retired until the end of 1997.

=== Lidded wagons "K Elberfeld / Wuppertal" ===
These lidded wagons were longer (length over buffers with and without hand brake: 9,100 and 9,800 mm (29 ft 10 in and 32 ft 2 in)) and had a greater wheelbase (4,000 mm (13 ft 1 in)) than their drawing A7 predecessors. The side walls were now divided into two panels by a vertical brace either side of the door. With the renaming of the recently formed town of Barmen-Elberfeld to Wuppertal in 1930 the designation of this class also changed.

=== Livestock wagons "V Altona / Hamburg" ===
Just like the A8 DSV wagon, a livestock van also appeared in Austauschbau configuration that, in terms of dimensions, maximum load and technical properties, was the same as the covered van (see above). Initially built with rivetted technology, in 1936/37 another 27 welded wagons were built, all without hand brakes. With the absorption of Altona into Hamburg, the class name also changed from 1938.

=== Large volume covered vans "Gl(t)(r)(h)(s) Dresden", covered vans "G(e)hs Oppeln" ===
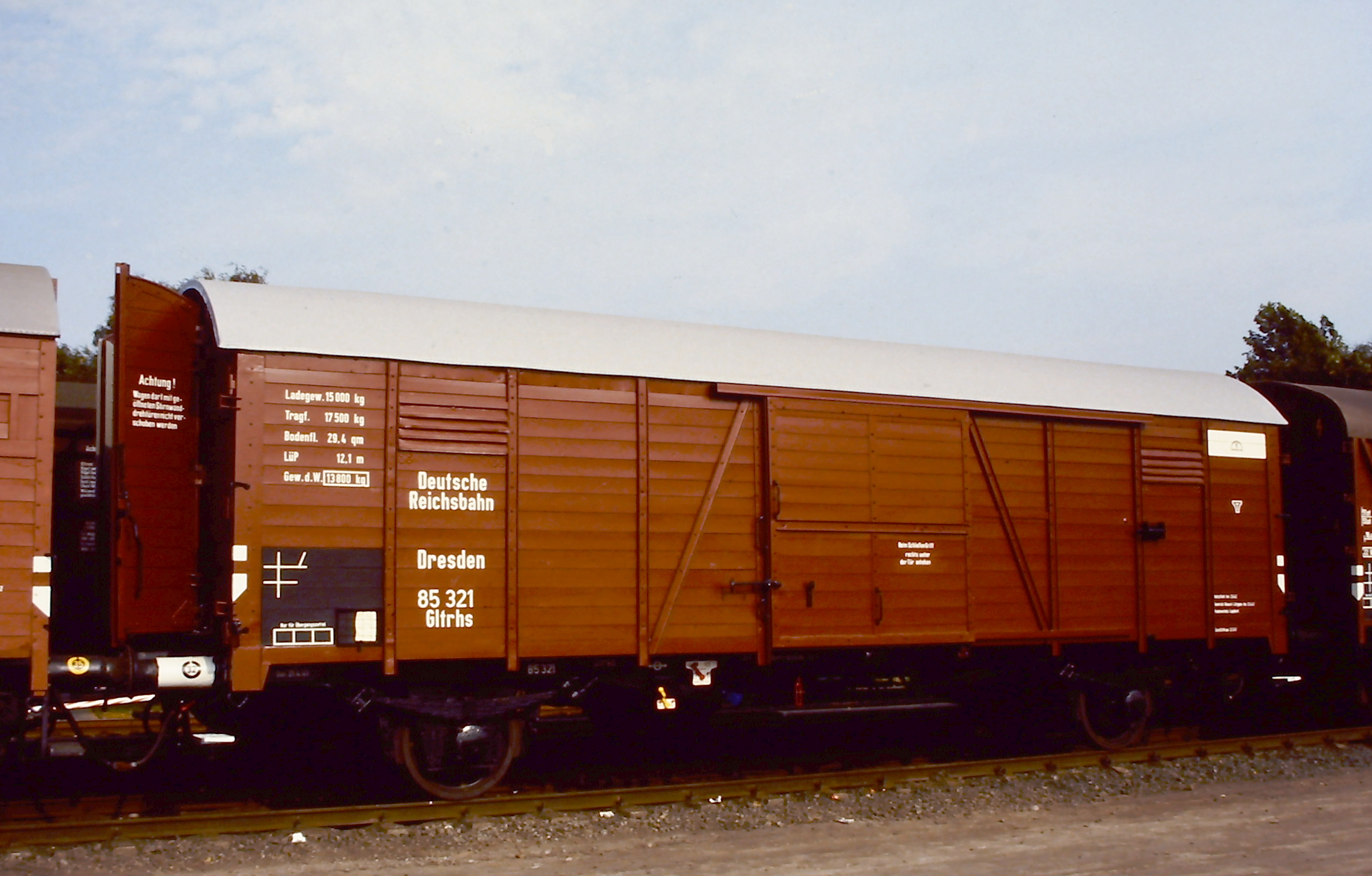
Dresden Gltrhs

These large volume, covered goods wagons can be distinguished from the A9 DSV wagon version by their different roof shape, trapezoidal strut frame and diagonal braces on the wagon body in the section next to the door. They were built in rivetted and, later, in welded form in various configurations: with end doors on one or both ends and sometimes with exchangeable wheelsets and/or steam heating pipes. The Gl wagons were often used in Leig-Einheit pairs for the transportation of express, part-load goods.

From 1933 onwards, 650 Dresden class wagons were built, still in rivetted form, with an axle base increased from 7,000 to 7,700 mm (23 ft 0 in to 25 ft 3 in). These demonstrated excellent running qualities and were therefore permitted to be used at speeds up to 90 km/h (56 mph) (secondary letter s). However the long axle base meant the wagons did not fit on most weighbridges. Even the wagons built from 1935 with a 7,000 mm axle base were authorised for 90 km/h running in spite of their long overhang.

After these experiences a completely new goods wagon was developed and built from 1934. It was produced only with a hand brake, and had a 7,000 mm axle base and overall length over buffers of 10,800 mm (35 ft 5 in). Like the Gl Dresden with a 7,700 mm axle base, it had a trapezoidal strut frame and very good riding qualities due to its short overhang. Because its size was between that of the Gl and G wagons, it was grouped into the newly formed Oppeln class. To distinguish it from the later, shorter type (see above) it is often referred to as the "long Oppeln".

=== Open goods wagons "Om Königsberg, Breslau, Essen" ===
The open goods wagons of the Königsberg class, with a 20-ton maximum load were manufactured from 1927 in Austauschbau form. They could barely be distinguished from the A10 Verbandsbauart versions which had been built from 1923. As a result, the literature often wrongly cites the first year of manufacture of the Austauschbau form as 1923 or 1924. Its 9,100 mm (29 ft 10 in) length over buffers (9,800 mm (32 ft 2 in) with hand brake) had a 4,500 mm (14 ft 9 in) axle base and was also used for the other wagon classes "G Kassel" (see above) and "V Altona" (see above) as well as numerous special and private goods wagons.

From 1935 to 1939 close to 4,000 welded Om wagons appeared, without handbrakes, that were grouped into the Breslau and Essen classes.

From 1939 the production of these wagons in Germany was halted in favour of the larger Omm wartime open wagons (Kriegsbauart) with a 25-ton maximum load. By contrast, in several occupied territories during the Second World War, rivetted Königsberg class wagons were built in significant quantities, so that between 1927 and 1941 a total of just under 20,000 examples were produced.

The Om wagons were retired by the DB in the 1960s, but they were still indispensable in the DR in East Germany until the 1970s.

=== Rail wagons "Sm Augsburg" ===
This four-wheeled, flat wagon with 8,000 mm axle base, 12,988 mm loading length, 20 ton maximum load and no hand brake was built from 1927. It differed from the Verbandsbauart version based on technical drawing A11 in a large number of design details. Including the welded wagons, a total of about 700 were built up to 1938.

Only 20 units were made in 1939 with fish belly girders and interchangeable wheelsets, and classified as "Smr Augsburg". The design was however too expensive in comparison with the "Rs Stuttgart" (see above).

== Special goods wagons ==
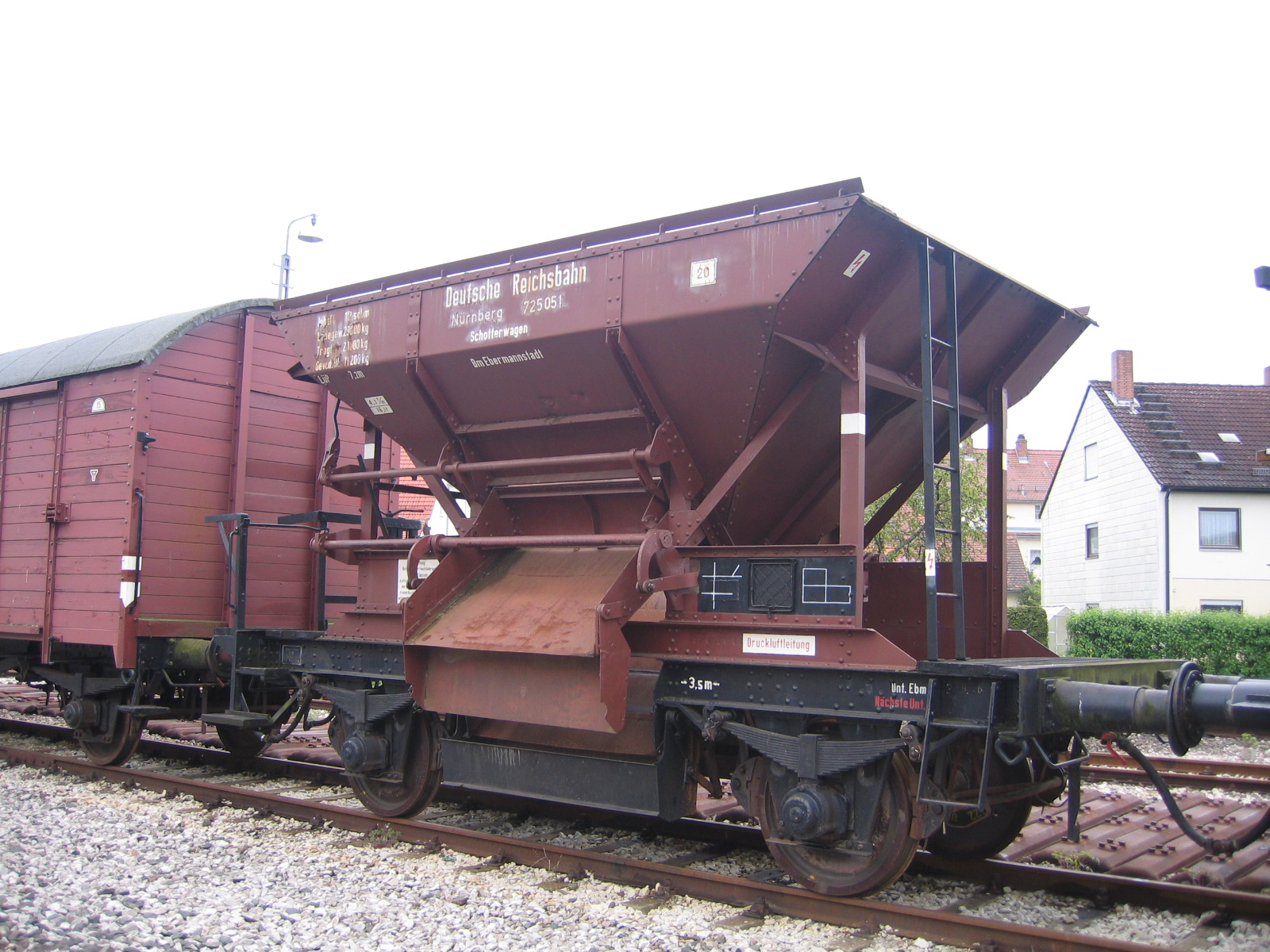
Talbot ballast hopper at Ebermannstadt in 2005 (Dampfbahn Fränkische Schweiz museum railway)

Despite all attempts at standardisation the 'special goods wagon' group became ever larger. Many standard components like the undercarriage with a 4,500 mm (14 ft 9 in) axle base, were used here. There was a range of wagons for special purposes, that were often designed to facilitate loading and unloading:

- As early as 1923 (thus to start with, not built as Austauschbau versions), four-wheeled, refrigerated vans (Kühlwagen) were built with modern insulation that, unlike the insulated vans used previously, were also suitable for the transportation of fish and frozen meat (Class Gk... Berlin).
- For ferry services with England, covered vans (Gfh), refrigerated vans (Gfkhs) and stake wagons (Rfh), all with a smaller loading gauge, were built from 1927. They were similar to the rivetted Austauschbau wagons (Class Trier, from 1935: Saarbrücken).
- Eight-wheeled, covered vans were procured in 1934 (Class GGhs Dresden). These had a loading room and were significantly bigger than Gl vans Because they were very costly to build and maintain in comparison with four-wheeled vehicles, they were only produced in small numbers. Equally rare were the special vans for racehorses (GGvwehs Dresden).
- The Talbot ballast hoppers with controllable discharge were built from 1926 and classified as departmental wagons. They were manufactured from 1928 in large numbers in a revised design based on Austauschbau principles. In the following years the design was changed several times.
- For coal transportation in the Saar a four-wheeled hopper, with rapid discharge, was developed from that of the Prussian state railways (Otm(m) Mainz).
- Coal, coke and ore transportation over long distances could be achieved smoothly and considerably more efficiently from 1924 using trains composed of saddle-bottomed wagons (Sattelwagen) (Class OOt(n) Oldenburg, from 1935: Saarbrücken).
- For the conveyance of coal and coke from inland ports to the iron works in the Ruhrgebiet, special bucket wagons (Kübelwagen) were developed in 1933 (Ok Nürnberg).
- Special well wagons were built in small series or as one-offs to various sizes and maximum loads (Class U).
- In addition there was a great number of private goods wagons, e.g. fishtank wagons for live fish, beer vans and wine wagons, heated fruit vans, dry bulk goods wagons (for goods in powder form), tank and carboy wagons, all of which used components of the Austauschbau wagons as far as possible.

== See also ==
- History of rail transport in Germany
- Deutsche Reichsbahn-Gesellschaft
- Goods wagons of welded construction

== Literature and sources ==
- Autorenkollektiv: Güterwagen Handbuch, Transpress VEB Verlag für Verkehrswesen, Berlin, 1974.
- Behrends H et al.: Güterwagen-Archiv (Band 1 und 2), Transpress VEB Verlag für Verkehrswesen, Berlin 1989.
- Carstens S: Die Güterwagen der DB AG, MIBA-Verlag, Nürnberg 1998.
- Carstens S et al.: Güterwagen (Band 1 und 2), MIBA-Verlag, Nürnberg 2000.
- Carstens S et al.: Güterwagen (Band 3 und 4), MIBA-Verlag, Nürnberg 2003.
- Carstens S: Güterwagen (Band 5), MIBA-Verlag, Nürnberg 2008.
