= Donnerbüchse =

Four-wheeled, standard, open coach Donnerbüchse "Thunderbox"
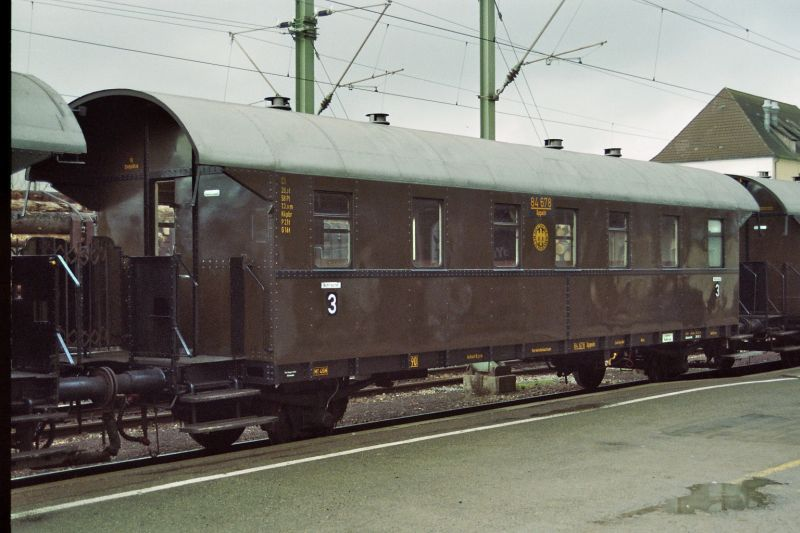
- A Thunderbox on a South German Railway Museum special service at Crailsheim, December 2007
- Constructed: 1921 to 1931
- Number built: 8255 passenger coaches; 917 luggage vans

Specifications
- Car length: 13,920 mm (45 ft 8 in); Bi-29: 14,040 mm (46 ft 3/4 in)
- Width: Wooden type: 3,000 mm (9 ft 10 1/8 in); Austauschbauart: 3,090 mm (10 ft 1 5/8 in); Bi-29: 2,996 mm (9 ft 10 in); Luggage van: 2,855 mm (9 ft 4 3/8 in)
- Wheel diameter: 1,000 mm (3 ft 3 3/8 in)
- Maximum speed: 90 km/h (56 mph)
- Weight: Wooden type: 18.0 t (17.7 long tons; 19.8 short tons); Iron type: 17.6–20.0 t (17.3–19.7 long tons; 19.4–22.0 short tons); All steel: 19.5–21.4 t (19.2–21.1 long tons; 21.5–23.6 short tons); Luggage van: 18.4–20.5 t (18.1–20.2 long tons; 20.3–22.6 short tons)

The German term Donnerbüchse (plural: Donnerbüchsen, formerly Donnerwagen) means "thunderbox" and is the nickname for the four-wheeled, open, passenger coaches, built from 1921 onwards, that served with the Deutsche Reichsbahn. In contrast to their predecessors, they were made entirely of iron or steel. The name comes from the loud rumbling of these coaches as a result of their lack of damping. Even the immediate forerunners of these wagons were given the name despite their wooden construction. In the early days, they were also called Ackermann'sche Donnerbüchse ("Ackermann's thunderboxes") after the departmental head responsible for them in the Ministry of Transport.

== History ==
Because the Deutsche Reichsbahn suffered from a great shortage of coaches following the ceasefire reparations at the beginning of the 1920s, in 1921 new passenger coaches were built based on standard designs, the so-called Einheitsbauart. Although a steel design was called for from the outset, most of the coach factories could not immediately change their production lines, so that the vast majority of the coaches in the first delivery batches were still built with wooden coach bodies. Between 1921 and 1923, 90 iron and 2,639 wooden coaches entered service. Whilst the wooden variants were exclusively built as 4th class coaches, the iron ones were delivered as 2nd, 3rd, 4th, 2nd/3rd and even 2nd/4th class coaches.

In a succession of procurement programmes, a further 517 4th class, all-steel coaches (440 in Austauschbauart form) were acquired in 1927/28, followed by a total of 5,009 coaches of 2nd, 3rd, 4th, 2nd/3rd and 3rd/4th classes (of which 3,377 were Austauschbauart versions) from 1928 to 1930, so that by 1930 more than 8,250 coaches had entered service. In 1928, when the Reichsbahn dropped the 4th class grade of accommodation, the 4th class coaches, which had initially been the largest group, were redesignated as 3rd class coaches at first and then, later, converted.

In addition to the passenger coaches, 917 Pwi luggage vans also appeared between 1923 and 1931 to a similar design.

== Types ==
=== Wooden coaches ===
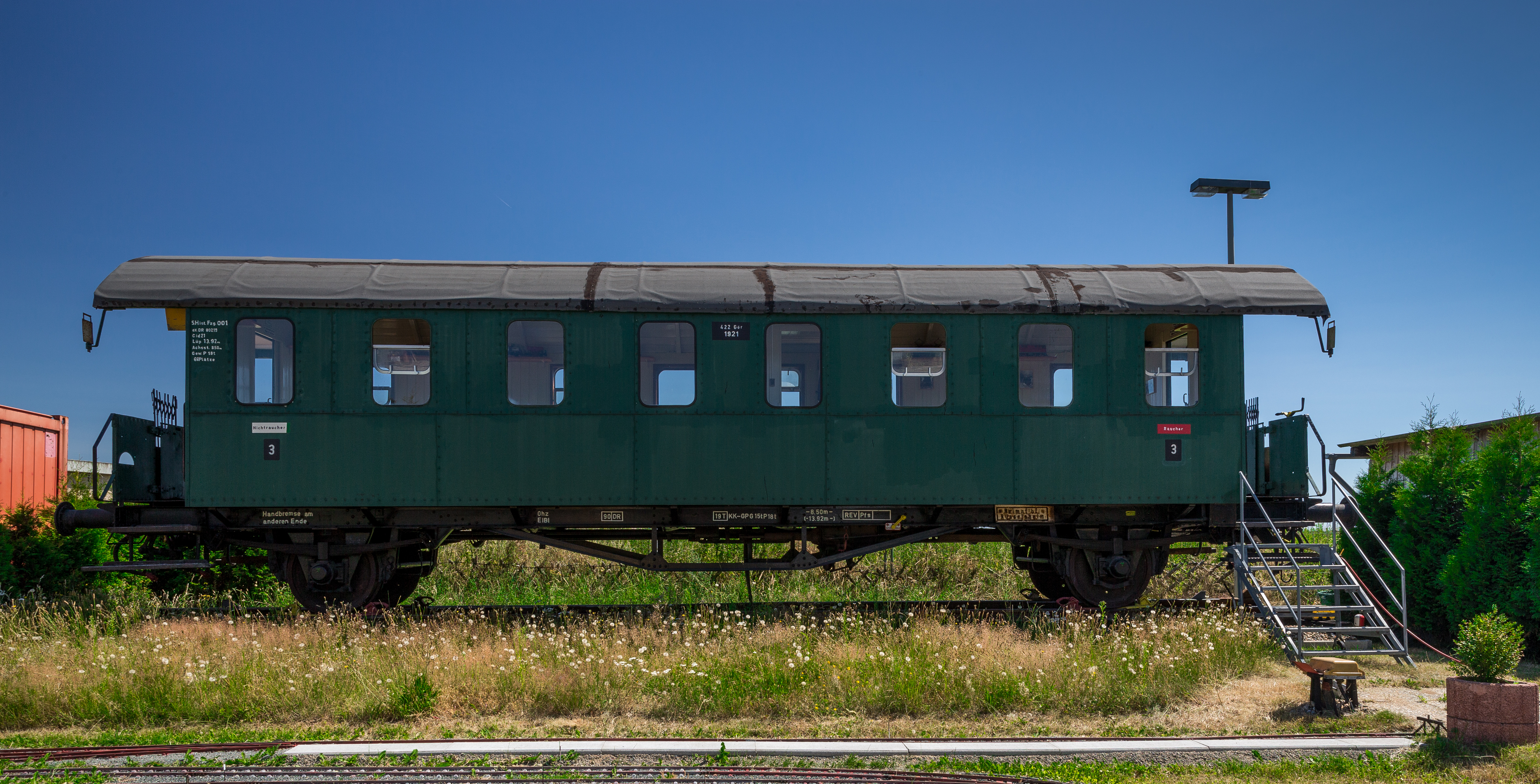
A 1921 Di-21, rebuilt to a Cid-21 in 1928.

Class to 1928	Class from 1928	Seats	Quantity	Year(s) of Manufacture	Remarks
Di-21c	Cid-21c	66	6	1921	Trial series
Di-21	Cid-21	66	2236	1921/23	
Di-21a	Cid-21a	66	397	1921/23	

=== Iron coaches ===
Class to 1928	Class from 1928	Seats	Quantity	Year(s) of Manufacture	Remarks
Bi-21	Bi-21	40	10	1921/23	Trial coaches
BCi-21	BCi-21	16/34	10	1921/23	Trial coaches
BDi-21	BCid-21	16/39	10	1923	Trial coaches
Ci-21	Ci-21	58	10	1923	Trial coaches
Di-21b	Cid-21b	66	50	1922	Trial coaches

=== All-steel coaches - "Donnerbüchsen" ===
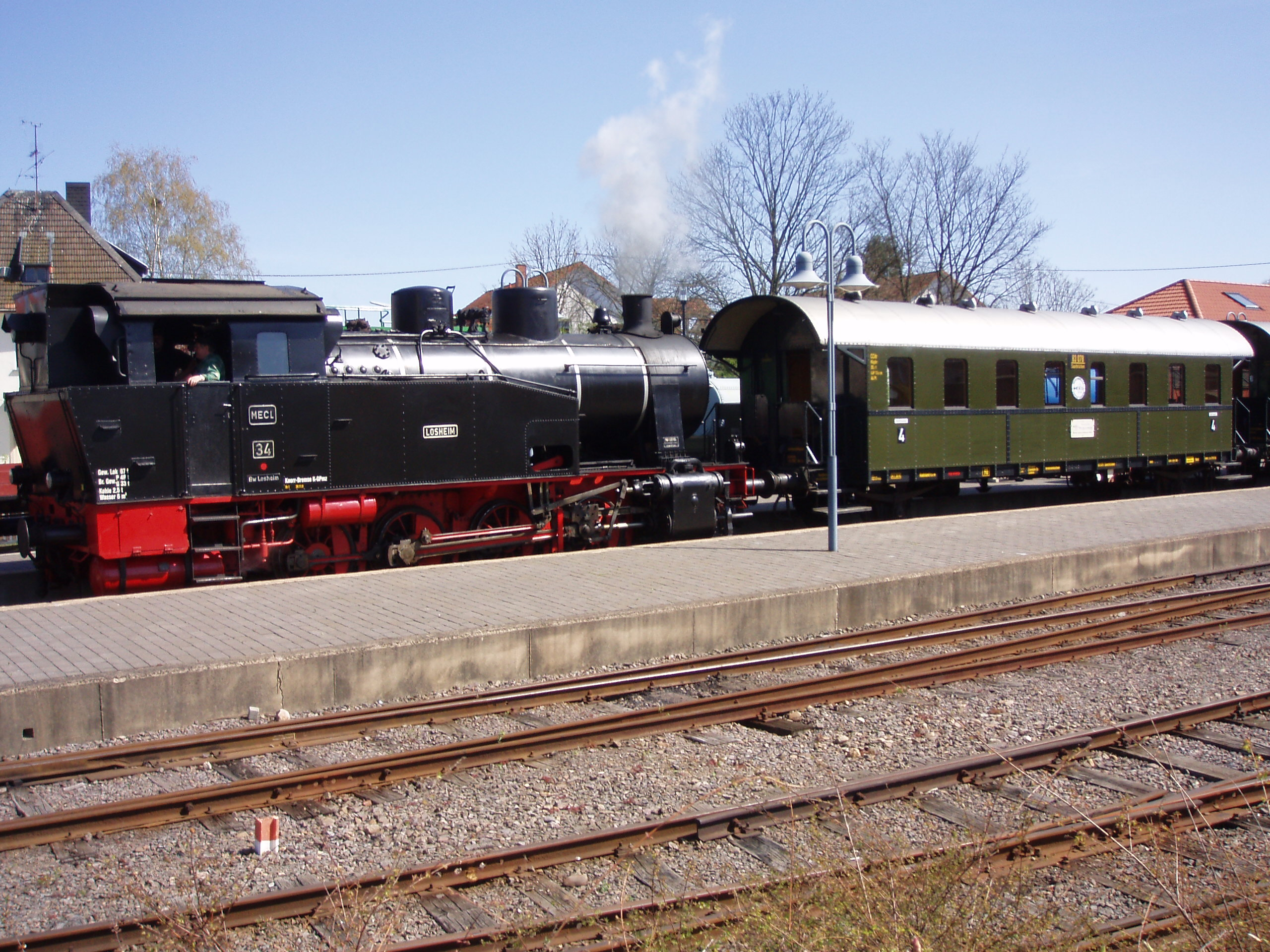
Steam engine with Cid-27

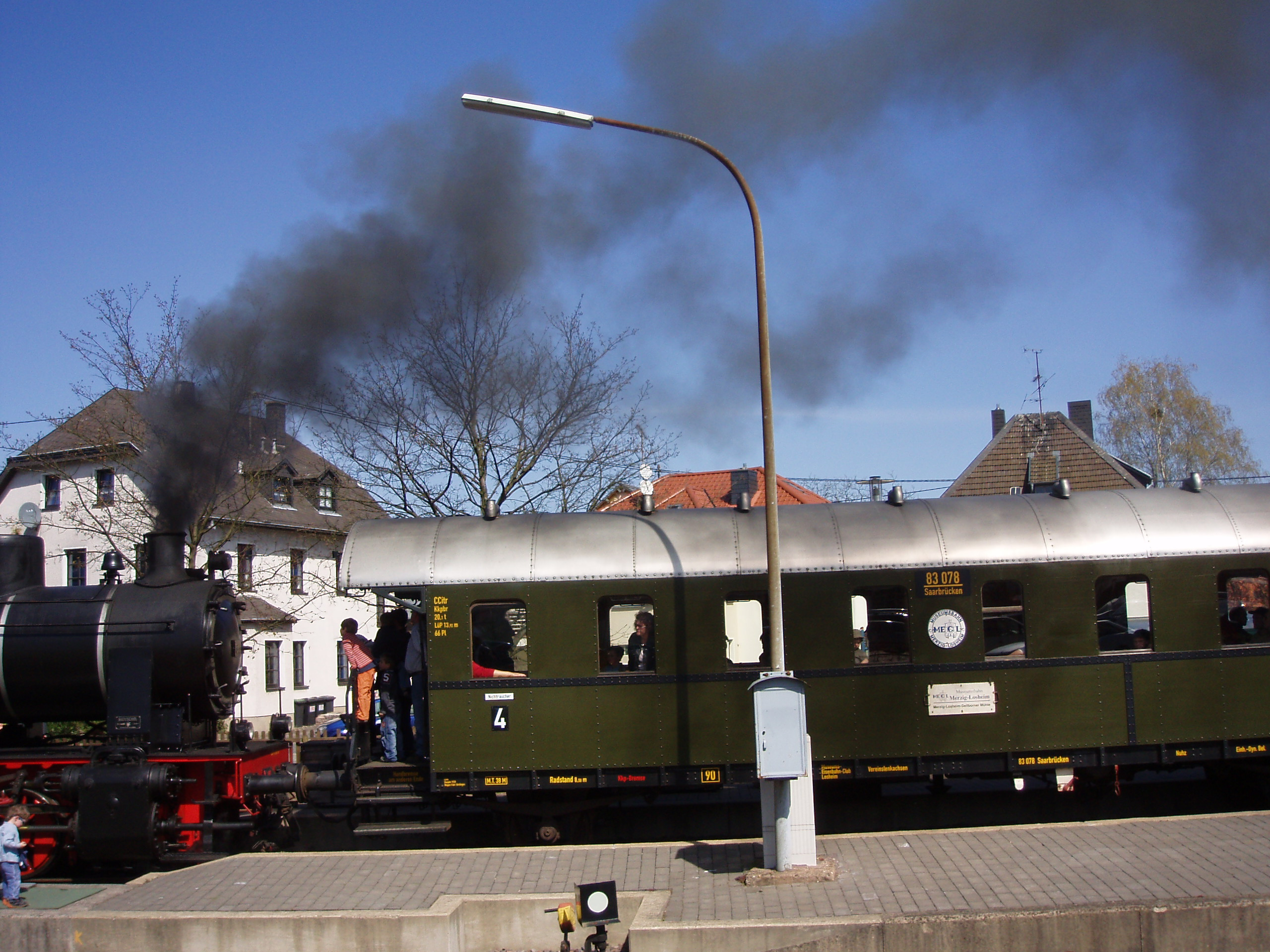
Cid-27 driving

Class to 1928	Class from 1928	Seats	Quantity	Year(s) of Manufacture	Remarks
Di-26	Cid-26	66	77	1927/28	
Di-27	Cid-27; Ciu-27/28	66	440	1927/28	Austauschbau
BCi-28	BCi-28	15/34	449	1928/29	Austauschbau
Ci-28	Ci-28	58	1744	1928/29	Austauschbau
CDi-28	CCid-28; CCiu-28	29/29	40	1928	Austauschbau
Bi-29	Bi-29	38	1632	1929/30	
BCi-29	BCi-29	15/34	500	1929/30	Austauschbau
Ci-29	Ci-29	58	450	1929/30	Austauschbau
Ci-30	Ci-30	58	194	1929/30	Austauschbau

=== Luggage vans ===
Class to 1928	Class from 1928	Maximum load	Quantity	Year(s) of manufacture	Remarks
Pwi-23	Pwi-23	7,0 t	287	1923/27	
Pwi-27	Pwi-27	7,0 t	40	1927/28	
Pwi-28	Pwi-28	7,0 t	40	1928	Austauschbau
Pwi-29	Pwi-29	7,0 t	370	1929/30	Austauschbau
Pwi-30	Pwi-30	7,0 t	150	1930	Austauschbau
Pwi-31	Pwi-31	7,0 t	30	1931	Austauschbau

== Conversions and operation ==
From 1930 several Di-21 coaches were converted to heavy hand luggage vans (Traglastenwagen).

In 1930 and 1934, 28 Cid-21/21a coaches had simple post compartments fitted, they were designated as class C Postid-21/34 and, later, as B Postid-21/34.

The DB replaced the original wooden benches, in many cases, by upholstered seating. When 3rd class travel services were discontinued in 1956 the coaches were reclassified accordingly.

In 1951 several Ci coaches were converted into driving trailers (CPwif) for shuttle services headed by steam locomotives. They had a driver's cab fitted at one end, were given red livery and a luggage compartment.

At the beginning of the 1960s the retirement of the Donnerbüchsen began; however many were converted to works coaches (Bauzugwagen) and used as such. The Bundesbahn used the last coaches in passenger services at the end of the 1970s. These coaches are still working today on many museum railways.

In Poland Donnerbüchsen were used in passenger train services until 1989.

== See also ==
- History of rail transport in Germany
- Deutsche Reichsbahn-Gesellschaft
