= Kriegsbauart =

Railway goods wagons developed in WWII

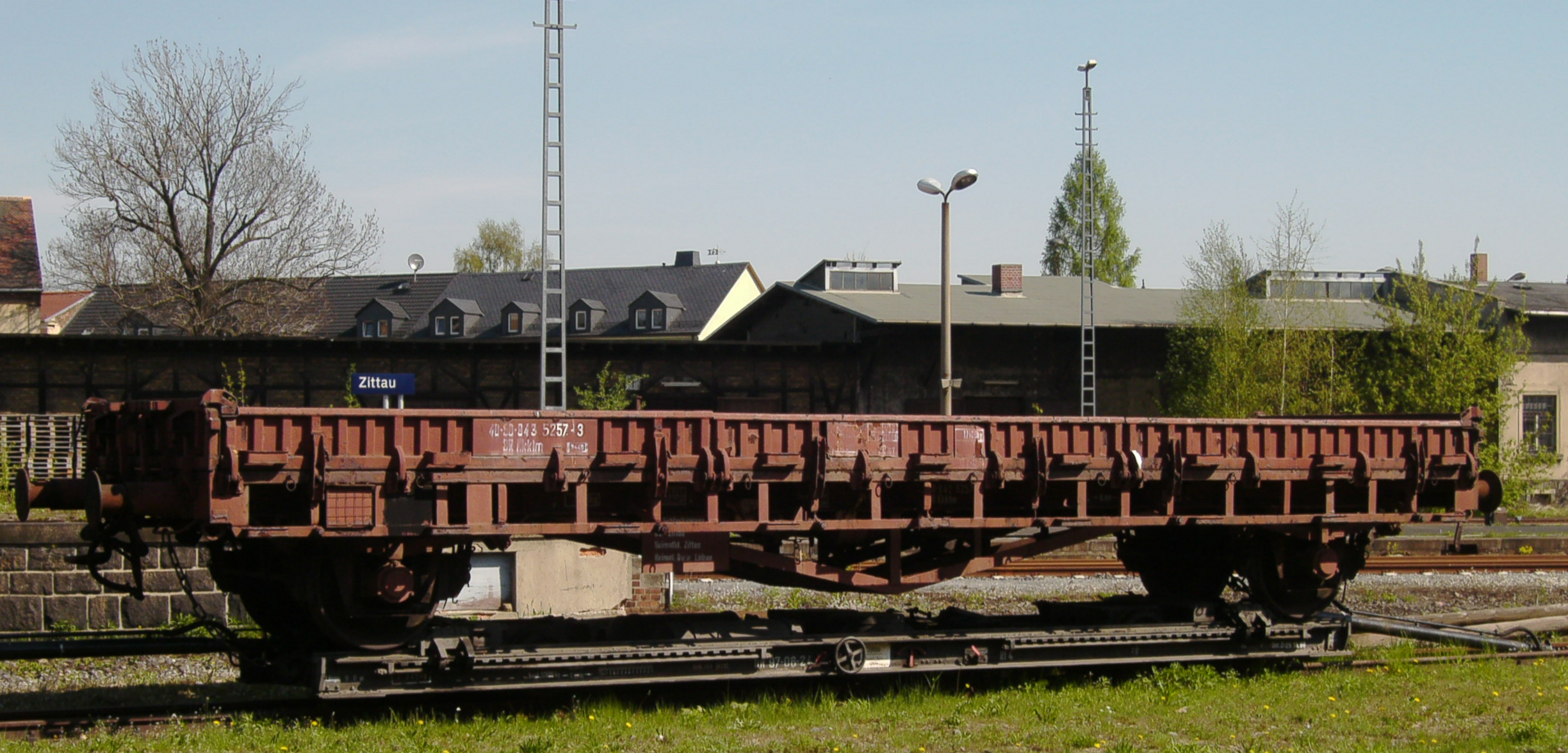
"R(r)(h) Stuttgart", "R(m)(r)s Stuttgart" with 8m axle base, after removal of stakes and waybill basket, finally used as a flatcar

Kriegsbauart (German, 'wartime class') refers to railway goods wagon classes that were developed during the Second World War for the Deutsche Reichsbahn. The start of the war was an arbitrary dividing line for the classification of goods wagons, and did not represent any technological change. In the period shortly before the war, goods wagons were already being designed from a military perspective. This was particularly true for the stake wagons of 1938, which are occasionally referred to as a 'pre-war class' (Vorkriegsbauart) of wagons.

The transition from the welded Austauschbauart goods wagons to the first Kriegsbauart classes was therefore defined, not so much by design changes, but far more by a concentration on fewer types of wagons and their construction in greater numbers. The cause of this was the rapid increase in transportation tasks, because the railways in German were sucked into the events of war as never before. The Deutsche Reichsbahn was seen as an indispensable partner of National Socialism, both for the transportation of vehicles, troops and supplies as well as the deportation of Jews to the Nazi concentration camps.

From 1954, the Deutsche Reichsbahn in East Germany put many goods wagons through its reconstruction programme. Some of these ''Reko'' goods wagons were in service until the start of the 1990s.

For consistency, the division of the goods wagons described in this article is based on that in the Austauschbauart article.

== Standard goods wagons ==
Of the eight standard goods wagons that were built in significant quantities as Austauschbauart classes, there were only four types for which there was a further requirement in 1939: the two covered vans (G…s Oppeln and Gl…s Dresden), the stake wagons (Rs Stuttgart) and the open goods wagons (Om). Because the first three had been continuously developed during the 1930s, they still met wartime requirements and were built in very large batches during the early years of the war. They sometimes had so-called refinements that speeded up production and minimised the amount of steel used.

For the open wagons, by contrast, not only was a higher maximum load demanded, but also a greater loading volume. As a result, in 1937/38 the Omm wagon was designed from scratch with a maximum load of 24.5 tons and a loading length of 8.72 metres (28.6 ft) (as opposed to 7.72 m or 25.3 ft on Om wagons). Construction began in 1939. Notable external features are the axle base of 6 m (20 ft) and the three-dimensional strut frame that tapers downwards to a point. A total of 73,850 of these wagons appeared in three variants:

| Class | Grouping | Side walls | Sole bar | Years of manufacture | Quantity |
|---|---|---|---|---|---|
| Ommr | Linz | 1.00 m (3 ft 3 in) high and removable | inside, fish-belly girder reinforcement | 1939−41 | 6130 |
| Ommr | Linz | 1.00 m (3 ft 3 in) high and removable | outside | 1941−43 | 18605 |
| Ommru | Villach | 1.55 m (5 ft 1 in) high and fixed | outside | 1939−45 | 49115 |

All Omm wagons were equipped with Hildebrandt-Knorr brakes as well as, in some cases, hand brakes. The Ommr Linz wagons were especially well-suited to carrying vehicles and had special securing equipment for that purposes.

== Standard goods wagons with steel-saving features ==
During the war, the four standard goods wagons were sometimes redesigned with slightly different dimensions. They had to be sparing in their use of steel, and faster and cheaper to manufacture. Sometimes design solutions were found that clearly streamlined goods wagon construction. These wagons, built from 1943 onwards, were lighter than their predecessors, but at the same time could carry more. However, the cost of using cheaper steel and thinner profiles was greater wear and tear and a permanent deformation from the outset. As a result, after a few years, extensive improvements were needed.

| Class | Grouping | Grouping of predecessor wagon | Changes to dead weight c.f. predecessor wagon, Data for wagons with hand brake | Quantity from 1943 to end of war | Quantity from end of war to 1950 |
|---|---|---|---|---|---|
| Gmhs | Bremen | Oppeln | -20% | 7200 | 6190 |
| Glmhs | Leipzig | Dresden | -17% | 4 | French zone of occupation 250 |
| Rmms | Ulm | Stuttgart | -16% | 12647 | Soviet zone of occupation ? |
| Ommru | Klagenfurt | Villach | -21% | 22944 | − |

== Special goods wagons ==
More special wagons appeared, albeit no longer in pre-war quantities. Several classes, which had already been developed before 1939, continued in production, sometimes modified. In order of production quantity they were:

- Refrigerated vans (class Gkhs Berlin) in large batches
- Eight-wheeled, saddle-bottomed wagons (OOt Saarbrücken), some with lids (KKt Saarbrücken)
- Ballast hoppers (Otmm)
- Bucket wagons (Ok Nürnberg) in small numbers.

Important new builds, in order of quantity, were:

- Eight- and twelve-wheeled, heavy rail flats for tank transportation
- Simple refrigerated vans based on the Gls van
- Eight-wheeled, covered vans with a huge 51 ton maximum load (GGths Bromberg), that the DR in East Germany used as a prototype for its post-war models
- Lidded wagons in small numbers with a design based on the Omm wagon (see above)
- Several trial versions of eight-wheeled open goods wagons.

== Identification markings and livery ==
From about 1942 almost all goods wagons of the Deutsche Reichsbahn were inscribed merely with the initials "DR", together with the name of a so-called "class district" (Gattungsbezirk), a wagon number ( Wagennummer) and category letters (Gattungszeichen). From 1940, the livery colours were changed again, for example, from December 1941 the iron roofs of covered wagons were painted black-brown (not a RAL colour) and, from, 1943, in a grey-black colour (RAL 7021).

=== Additional class districts ===
From 1921 all goods wagons with the same or similar functions were grouped into so-called class districts which were the names of German cities, mostly those in which there was a Reichsbahn divisional HQ. From 1942, the DRG introduced the following additional class districts:

Additional class districts of the Deutsche Reichsbahn from 1942
| Class districts | Category letters | Wagon type | Design | Period |
|---|---|---|---|---|
| Bremen | Gmhs | Covered wagons | Kriegsbauart | from 1943 |
| Graz | Ommuf | Open wagons for motor vehicle transport | Kriegsbauart - trial wagons | from 1943 |
| Heilbronn | RRs; SSos | Four-axled stake and rail wagons | Kriegsbauart - trial wagons | from 1943 |
| Klagenfurt | Ommu | Open wagons | Kriegsbauart | from 1942 |
| Leipzig | Glmhs | Large-volume covered wagons | Kriegsbauart | from 1943 |
| Marburg | Gu, O | Covered or open wagons | Yugoslavian design | from 1943 |
| Riga | GG, OO | Four-axled wagons | Latvian design | from 1943 |
| Ulm | Rmms | Stake wagons | Kriegsbauart | from 1942 |

See also:

- Verbandsbauart#Class districts of the Deutsche Reichsbahn, class districts from 1921
- Austauschbauart#Additional class districts, additional class districts from 1926
- Geschweißten Bauart#Additional class districts, additional class districts from 1935

== See also ==
- Austauschbauart
- Deutsche Reichsbahn-Gesellschaft
- German railway wagon classes
- German State Railway Wagon Association
- History of rail transport in Germany
- Verbandsbauart
- Goods wagons of welded construction
