= Class district =

German classification system for railway goods wagons

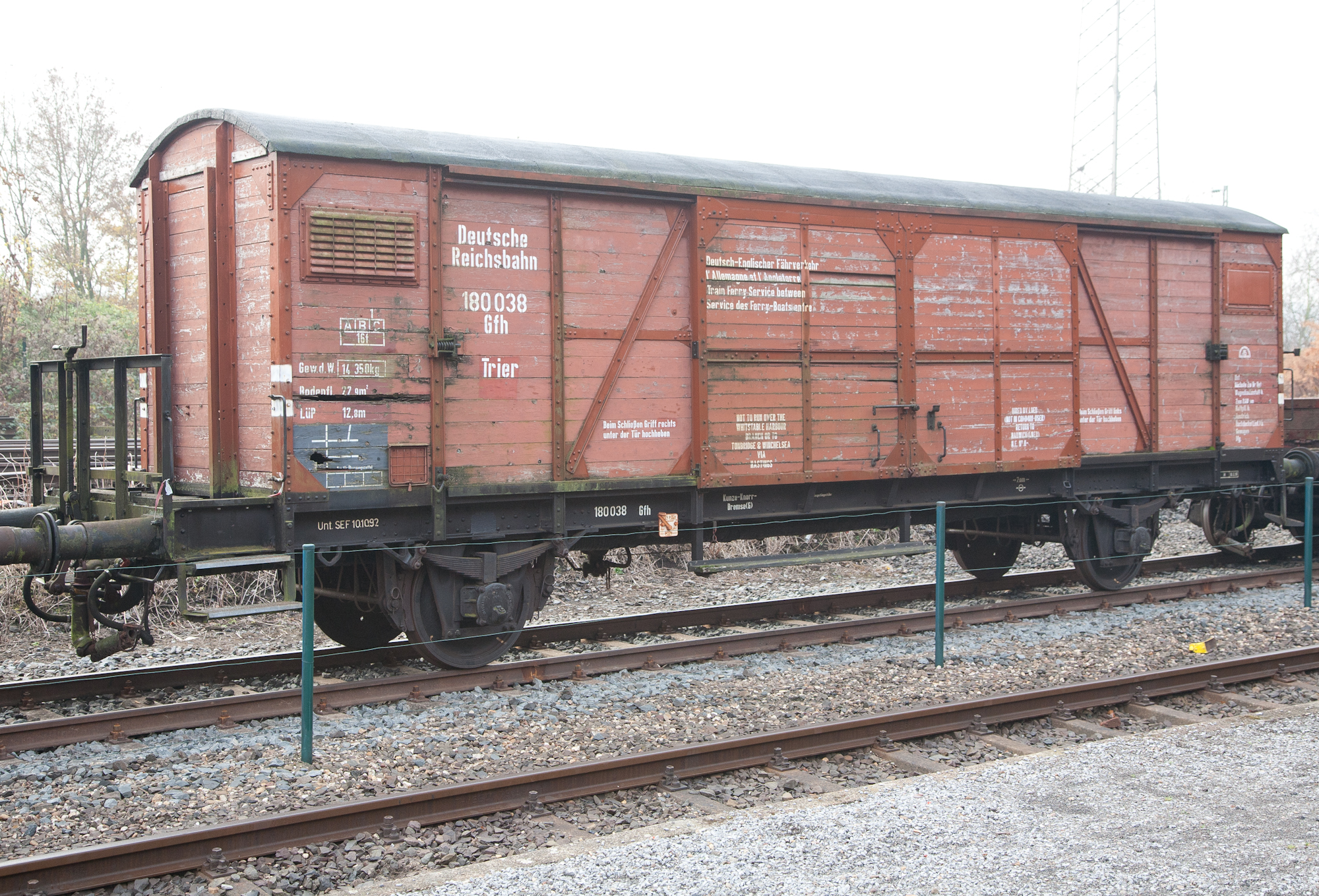
Wagon of the class district "Trier" (ferry van)

Class districts (German: Gattungsbezirke) were a classification system for railway goods wagons used by the Deutsche Reichsbahn (1920–1945) in Germany between the wars.

After the Deutsche Reichsbahn had been founded in 1920, in 1921 all goods wagons types with the same or similar roles were grouped into so-called class districts. These were named after cities that were the headquarters of a Reichsbahn division or, later, other cities too. Work on re-lettering and renaming the wagons began in 1922 and was largely completed by 1924.

Class districts of the Deutsche Reichsbahn from 1921
Class districts	Category letters	Wagon type	Class	Period
Altona, later Hamburg	V	Livestock van	S, V, A, W	1922–1937
Augsburg	S	Two and three-axled rail wagons	S, V, A, W	1922–1945
Berlin	Gk	Refrigerator vans	S, V, A, W	1922–1945
Breslau	Om	Open wagons	S, V, A, W	1922–1945
Dresden	G und GG	Large-volume vans	S, V, A, W	1922–1945
Elberfeld, later Wuppertal	K	Lidded wagons	S, V, A	1922–1930
Erfurt	X	Open departmental wagons	S, V, A, W	1922–1945
Essen	Om	Open wagons	V, W	1922–1945
Kassel (Cassel)	G	Covered wagons	V, A	1922–1945
Köln	SS	Rail wagons with four or more axles (flat wagons)	S, V, A, W	1922–1945
München	G	Covered wagons	Verbandsbauart	1922–1945
Nürnberg	O	Open wagons	Verbandsbauart	1922–1945
Regensburg	H	Cradle wagons	S, V, A	1922–1945
Stuttgart	R	Stake wagons	S, V, A, W	1922–1945

Legende:

- S = State railways
- V = Verbandsbauart
- A = Austauschbauart
- W = Welded

== See also ==
- Additional class districts from 1926
- Additional class districts from 1935
- Additional class districts from 1942
