= DRG Glrhs =

Railway goods wagon

DRG Glrhs DR Glrhs 12 DB Glrhs 33
- Constructed: from 1937

Specifications
- Car length: 12,800 mm (41 ft 11 7/8 in) over buffers
- Height: 4,100 mm (13 ft 5 3/8 in)
- Wheelbase: 7,000 mm (22 ft 11 1/2 in)
- Weight: Empty: 13.95 tonnes (13.73 long tons; 15.38 short tons)
- Track gauge: 1,435 mm (4 ft 8 1/2 in)

The covered goods wagons of classes Glrhs Dresden and Gltrhs Dresden were first placed in service in Germany by the Deutsche Reichsbahn-Gesellschaft in 1937. The wartime (Kriegsbauart) wagon, the DRB Glmhs Leipzig, and the wartime passenger wagon, the DRB MCi-43, were based on the Dresden classes.

The vehicles were of welded design and could be used in trains travelling at up to 90 km/h (56 mph).

The suspension comprised nine-layered leaf springs with a length of 1,650 mm (5 ft 5 in) and a cross section of 120 mm × 16 mm (4 3/4 in × 5/8 in). The springs were attached to their supports by means of rectangular suspension rings. The vehicles had an axle base of 7,000 mm (22 ft 11 1/2 in). The external sole bars had a strut frame as additional bracing.

The wagons were equipped with a heating pipe and constructed so that they could be converted for use on Russian broad gauge railways.

Both sides of the wagon had three loading or ventilation hatches and a sliding door measuring 2 m × 2 m (6 ft 6 3/4 in × 6 ft 6 3/4 in). Its loading length was 10.72 metres (35 ft 2 in), its width 2.74 metres (8 ft 11 3/4 in) and its loading height 2.845 metres (9 ft 4 in) to the highest point of the roof. The side walls were 2.12 m (6 ft 11 in) high and the loading area was 29.4 m^{2} (316 sq ft). Its loading volume was 79.1 m^{3} (2,790 cu ft) including the roof space and 62.3 m^{3} (2,200 cu ft) to the height of the walls.

The carrying capacity of the goods van was 17.5 tonnes (17.2 long tons; 19.3 short tons), the maximum load 15 tonnes (15 long tons; 17 short tons).

The wagon was also deployed in a variant with double end-doors, the Gltrhs on which the hand brake had to be omitted.

These vehicles had a length over buffers of 12.1 metres (39 ft 8 1/2 in) and an unladen weight of 13.95 tonnes (13.73 long tons; 15.38 short tons).

After the war these wagons went into the West German Deutsche Bundesbahn as Class Glrhs 33 and East German Deutsche Reichsbahn as Glrhs 12.
