= Brakeman's cabin =

Compartment on a railway wagon to shelter the brakeman

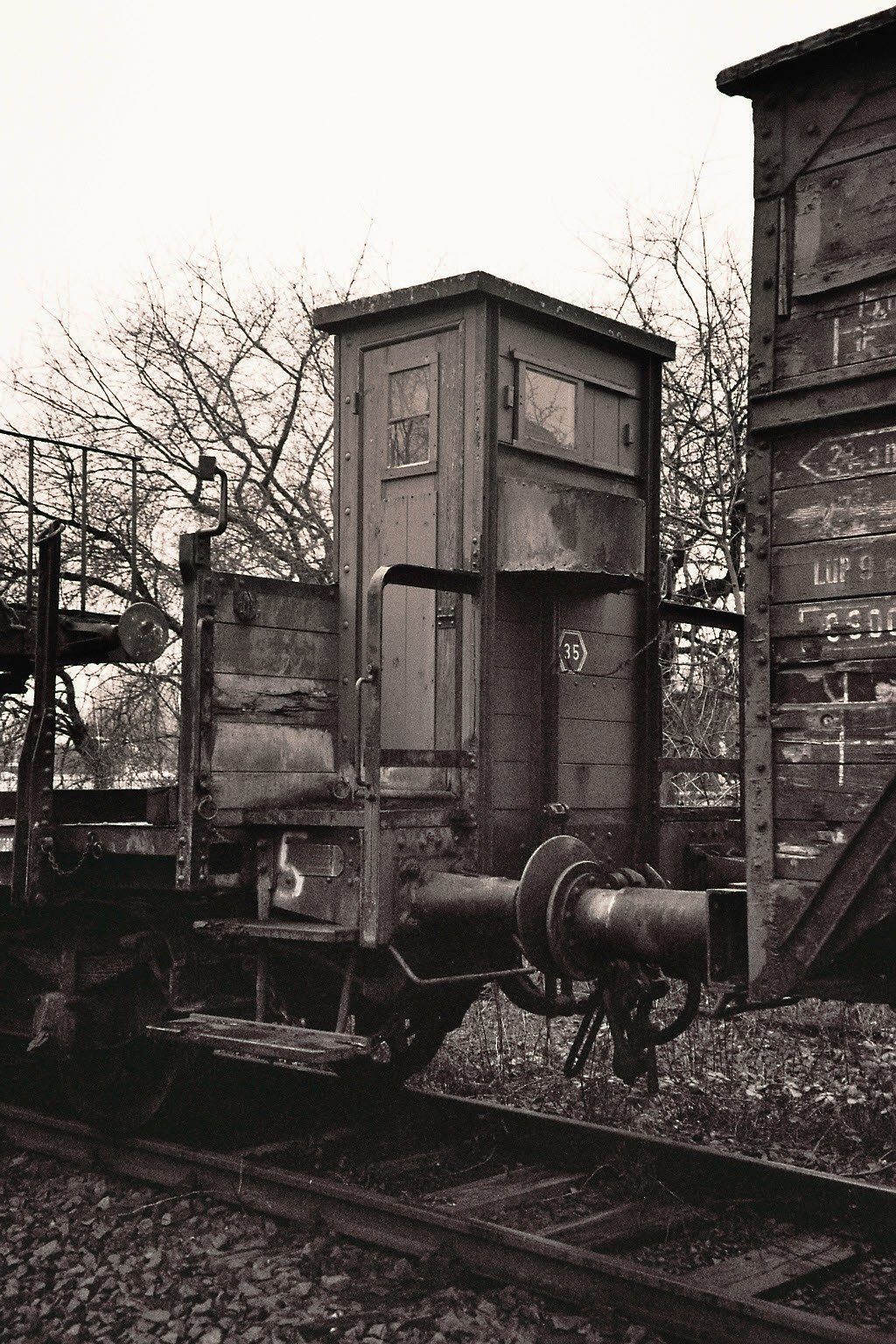
Brakeman's cabin on a German goods wagon built around 1920

A brakeman's cabin (also brakeman's cab) or brakeman's caboose (US) (German: Bremserhaus) was a small one-person compartment at one end of a railway wagon to provide shelter for the brakeman from the weather and in which equipment for manually operating the wagon brake was located. They were built in the days before continuous braking was available, and the locomotive brake needed to be augmented by brakemen applying the wagon brakes individually.

== History ==
In the early years of the railway, brakemen just had an open seat. The first cabs appeared around 1880. The number of brakemen's cabs occupied in a given train depended on the conditions of the route and the speed of the train; on some trains, all the cabs might be occupied. Communication between the engine driver and the brakemen was by train whistle signals, which required the design of the brakeman's cab to be partially open to the elements.

== Risk ==
Working in brakemen's cabins was dangerous, especially in winter because the cabins were unheated and drafty, and there was little room to move around and keep warm. As a result, brakemen frequently froze, sometimes even to death, placing the entire train at risk due to a lack of braking power.

== Decline ==
=== Germany ===
Brakeman's cabins became superfluous with the widespread introduction of compressed air brakes. In Germany, such brakes first appeared on D-Zug (express) trains at the end of the 19th century. The building of brakeman's cabins stopped on German passenger trains in the early 1900s and on goods trains around 1925. Goods wagons with a brakeman's cab were still regularly seen in Germany up to the mid-1970s, especially on Italian goods wagons. Some railway companies, such as the Italian FS and the Swiss SBB, even lasted until the 1990s.

== Gallery ==
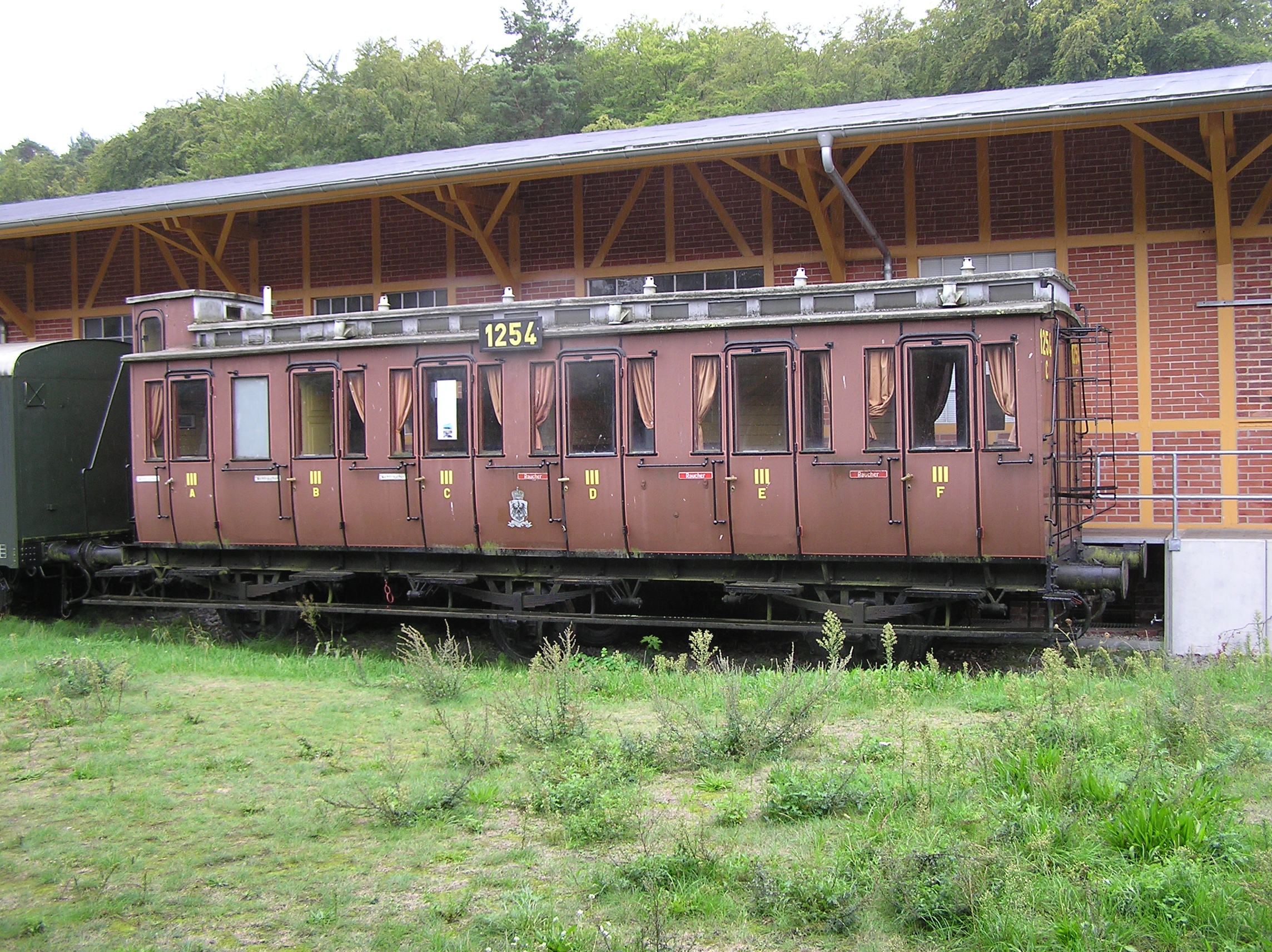
Prussian compartment coach with brakeman's cabin

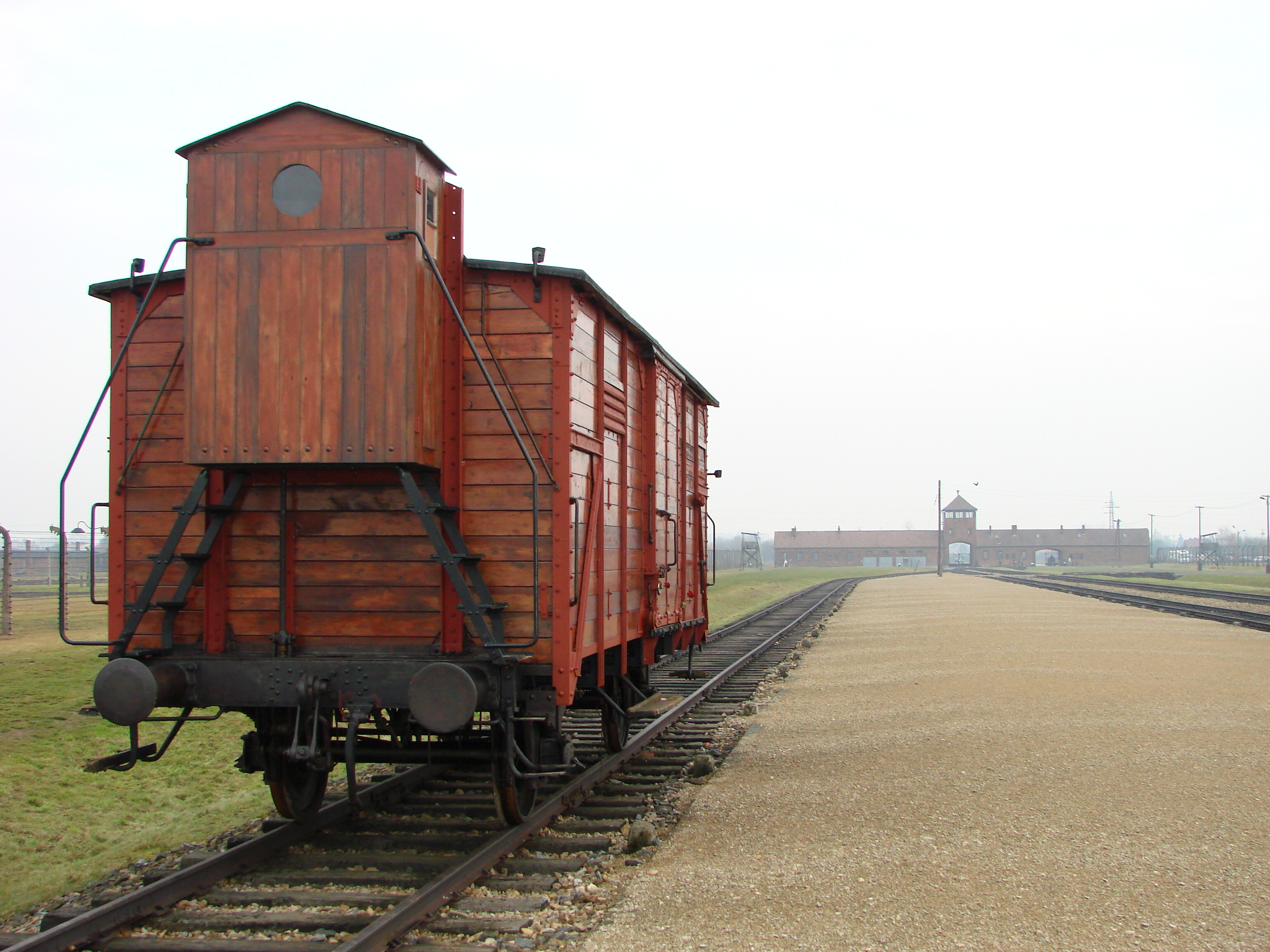
Cattle wagon with brakeman's cabin on Siding inside the Auschwitz concentration camp - Oświęcim - Poland.

== See also ==
- Brake van
- Caboose
