= RAL colour standard =

Colour matching system

RAL Colours logo

RAL is a colour management system used in Europe that is created and administered by the German RAL gGmbH (RAL non-profit LLC), which is a subsidiary of the German RAL Institute. In colloquial speech, RAL refers to the RAL Classic system, mainly used for varnish and powder coating, but now plastics as well. Approved RAL products are provided with a hologram to make unauthorised versions difficult to produce. Imitations may show different hue and colour when observed under various light sources.

== RAL colour space system ==
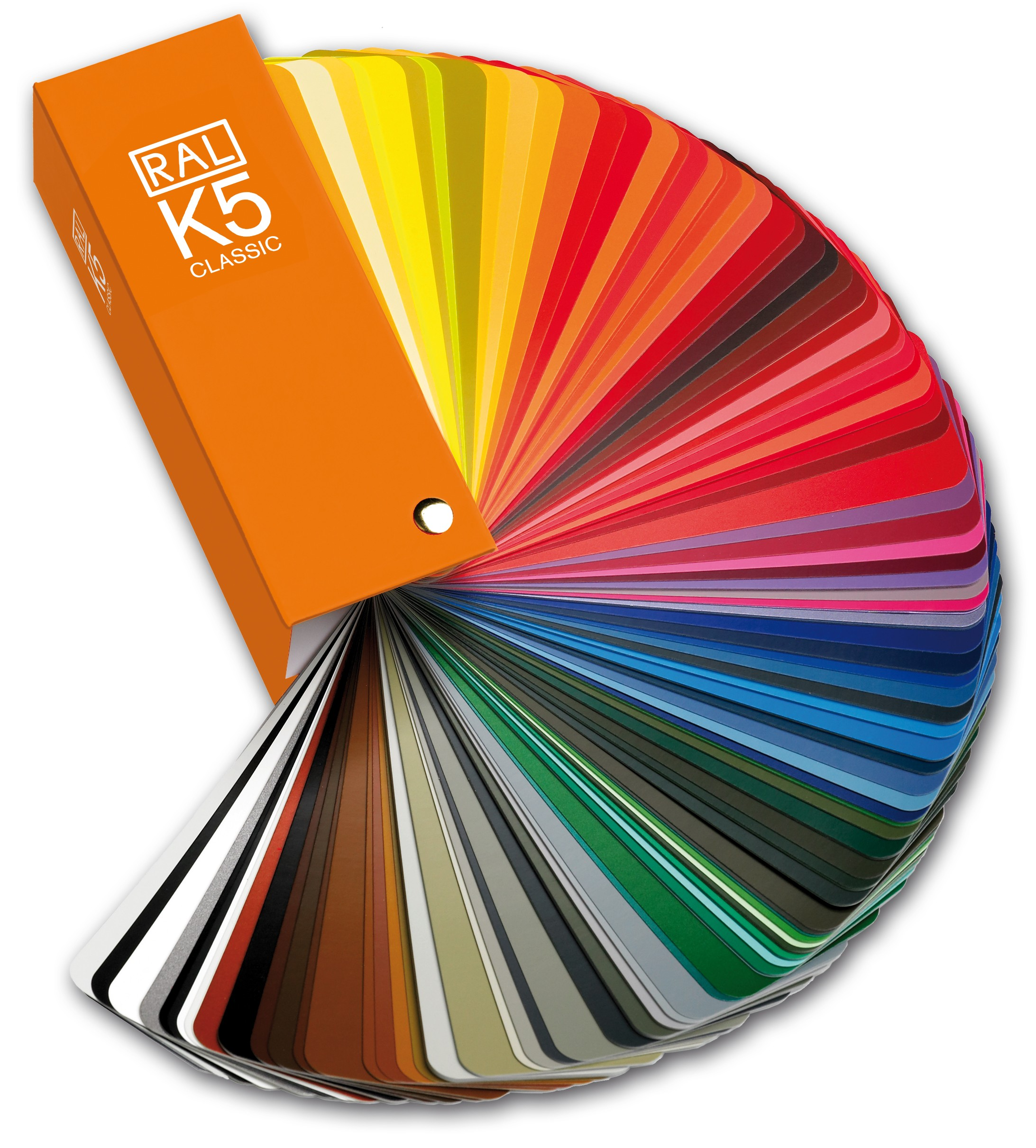
RAL CLASSIC K5 colour fan

=== RAL Classic ===
In 1927, the German group Reichs-Ausschuß für Lieferbedingungen und Gütesicherung (Imperial Committee for Delivery and Quality Assurance) invented a collection of forty colours under the name of "RAL 840". Prior to that date, manufacturers and customers had to exchange samples to describe a tint, whereas from then on they would rely on numbers.

In the 1930s, the numbers were changed uniformly to four digits and the collection was renamed to "RAL 840 R" (R for revised). Around 1940, the RAL colours were changed to the four-digit system, as is customary. Army camouflage colours were always recognised by a "7" or "8" in the first place until 1944. With tints constantly added to the collection, it was revised again in 1961 and changed to "RAL 840-HR", which consists of 210 colours and is in use to this day. In the 1960s, the colours were given supplemental names to avoid confusion in case of transposed digits. At the international furnishing fair imm Cologne, 13-19 January 2020, two new colours were presented in the Classic Collection: RAL 2017 RAL orange and RAL 9012 Cleanroom White.

"RAL 840-HR" covered only matte paint, so the 1980s saw the invention of "RAL 841-GL" for glossy surfaces, limited to 193 colours. A main criterion for colours in the RAL Classic collection is to be of "paramount interest". Therefore, most of the colours in it are used on warning and traffic signs or are dedicated to government agencies and public services (for example: RAL 1004 - Swiss Postal Service, RAL 1021 - Austrian Postal Service, RAL 1032 - German Postal Service). The first digit relates to the shade of the colour:

Overview of the RAL colour standard
Range	Range Name	First	Last	Quantity
RAL 1xxx	Yellow	RAL 1000 Green beige	RAL 1037 Sun yellow	30
RAL 2xxx	Orange	RAL 2000 Yellow orange	RAL 2017 RAL orange	14
RAL 3xxx	Red	RAL 3000 Flame red	RAL 3033 Pearl pink	25
RAL 4xxx	Violet	RAL 4001 Red lilac	RAL 4012 Pearl blackberry	12
RAL 5xxx	Blue	RAL 5000 Violet blue	RAL 5026 Pearl night blue	25
RAL 6xxx	Green	RAL 6000 Patina green	RAL 6039 Fibrous green	37
RAL 7xxx	Grey	RAL 7000 Squirrel grey	RAL 7048 Pearl mouse grey	38
RAL 8xxx	Brown	RAL 8000 Green brown	RAL 8029 Pearl copper	20
RAL 9xxx	White/Black	RAL 9001 Cream	RAL 9023 Pearl dark grey	15

=== RAL F9 ===
This collection, which follows the naming of RAL Classic, was invented in 1984. It is now made up of ten colours ( RAL 1039-F9 Sand beige, RAL 1040-F9 Clay beige, RAL 6031-F9 Bronze green, RAL 6040-F9 Light olive, RAL 7050-F9 Camouflage grey, RAL 8027-F9 Leather brown, RAL 8031-F9 Sand brown, RAL 9021-F9 Tar black and RAL 6031-F9 HR Bronze green semi-matt) used by the Bundeswehr for military camouflage coating.

=== RAL Design ===
In 1993 a new colour matching system was introduced, tailored to the needs of architects, designers and advertisers. It started with 1,688 colours and was revised to 1,625 colours and again to 1,825 colours. The colours of RAL Classic and RAL Design do not intersect.

Contrary to the preceding systems, RAL Design features no names and its numbering follows a scheme based on the CIELAB colour space, specifically cylindrical CIEHLC. Each colour is represented by seven digits, grouped in a triple and two pairs, representing hue (000–360 degrees, angle in the CIELab colour wheel), lightness (same as in L*a*b*) and chroma (relative saturation). The three numeric components of almost all RAL Design colours are multiples of 5, the majority are divisible by 10.

Conversion from RAL Design number tuple to CIELAB
$$\begin{align}\text{RAL}_\text{Design} &= \left(h_{ab}^{\circ}, L^{*}, C_{ab}^{*}\right)\\
a^{*} &= C_{ab}^{*}\cdot\cos\left(h_{ab}^{\circ}\right)\\
b^{*} &= C_{ab}^{*}\cdot\sin\left(h_{ab}^{\circ}\right)\end{align}$$

RAL 210 50 15 converts to L* = 50, a* = −12.99, b* = −7.5, for instance.

=== RAL Effect ===
RAL Effect comprises 420 solid colours and seventy metallic colours. It is the first collection from RAL to be based on waterborne paint systems.

=== RAL Digital ===
RAL Digital is software that allows designers to navigate the RAL colour space.

== See also ==
- Colour chart, other colour systems and charts
- Federal Standard 595
- List of RAL colours
- Natural Color System
- Pantone
