= Kunze–Knorr brake =

Automatic train brake

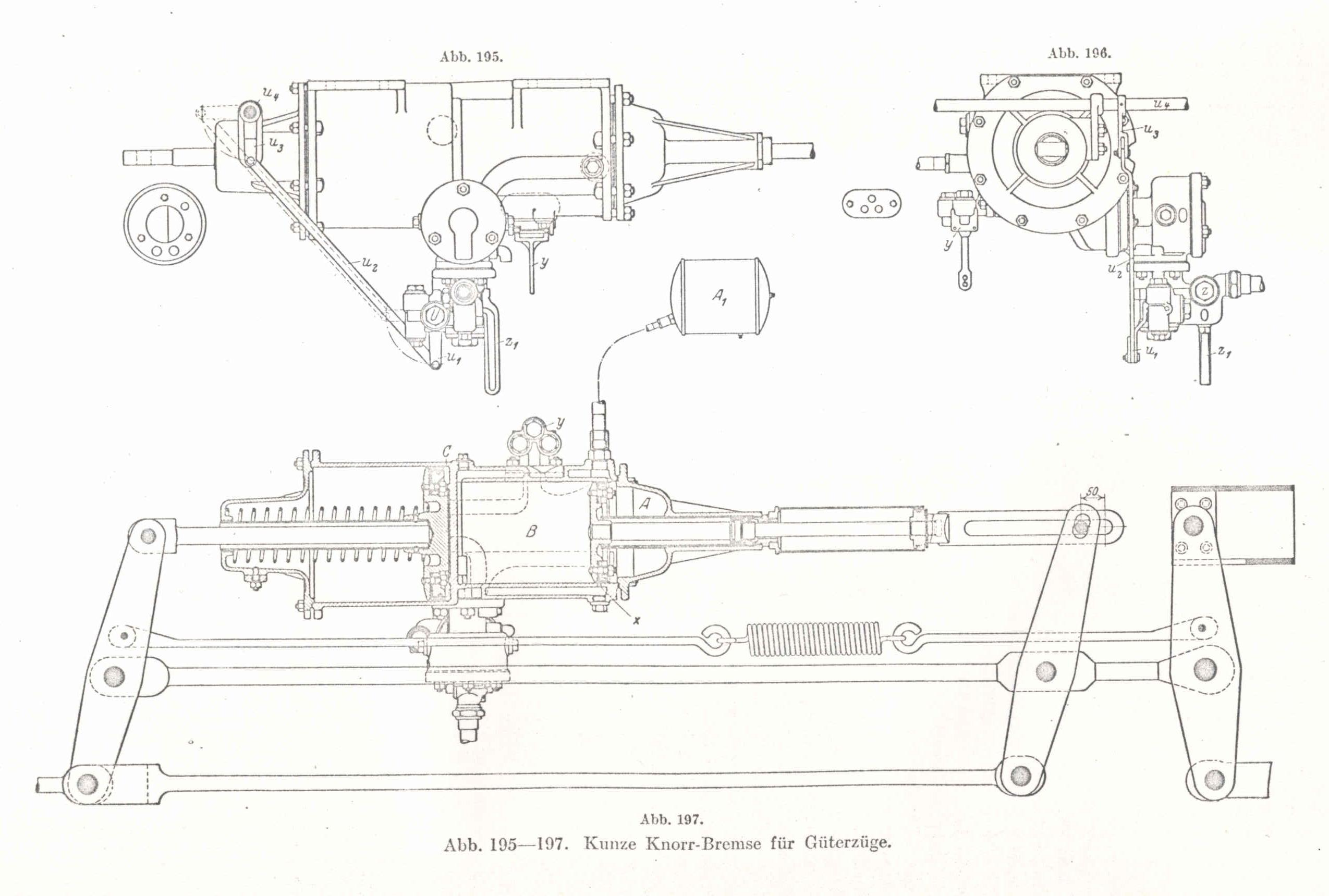
Kunze-Knorr goods train brake (diagram)

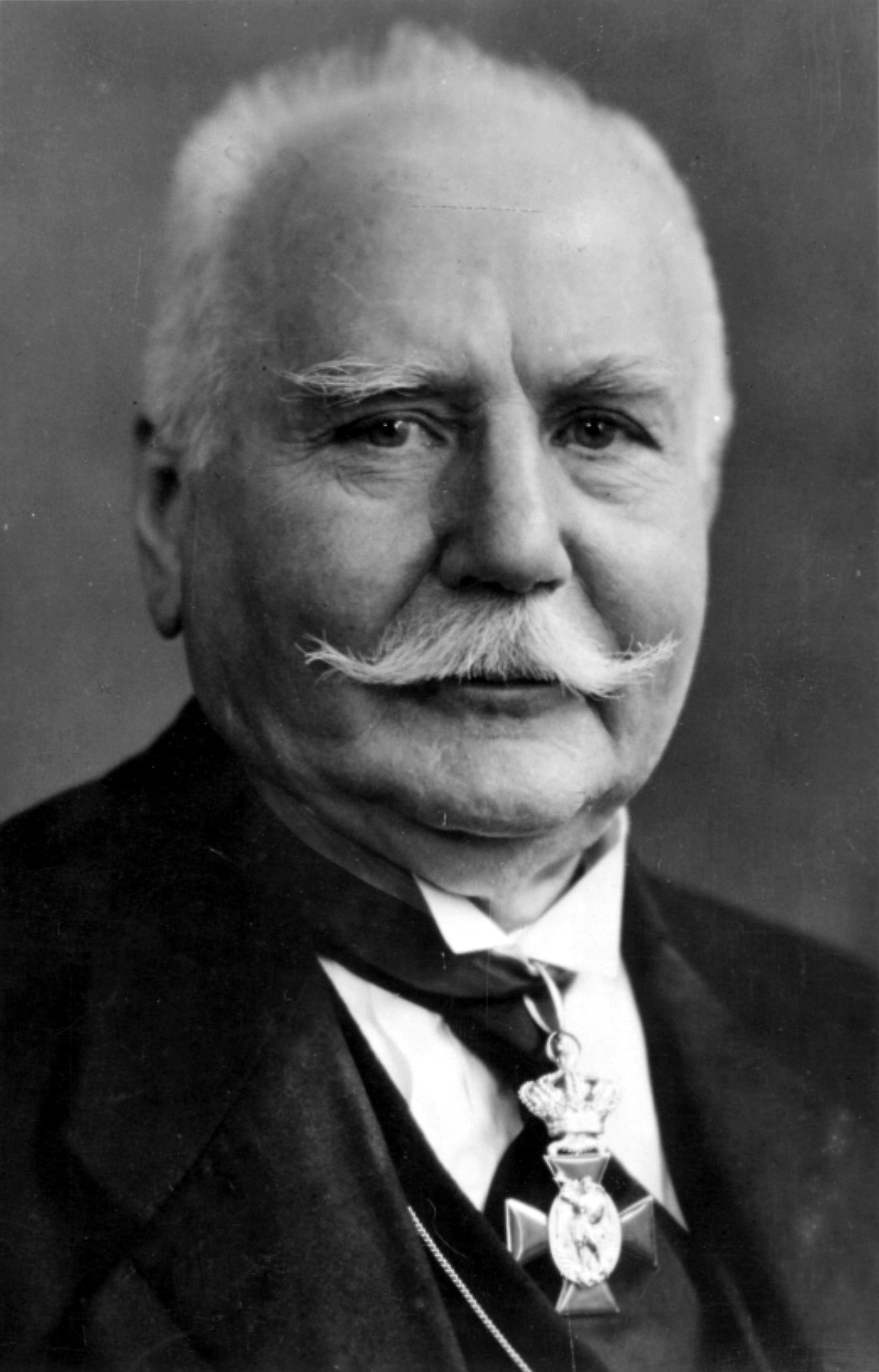
Bruno Kunze (1854–1935)

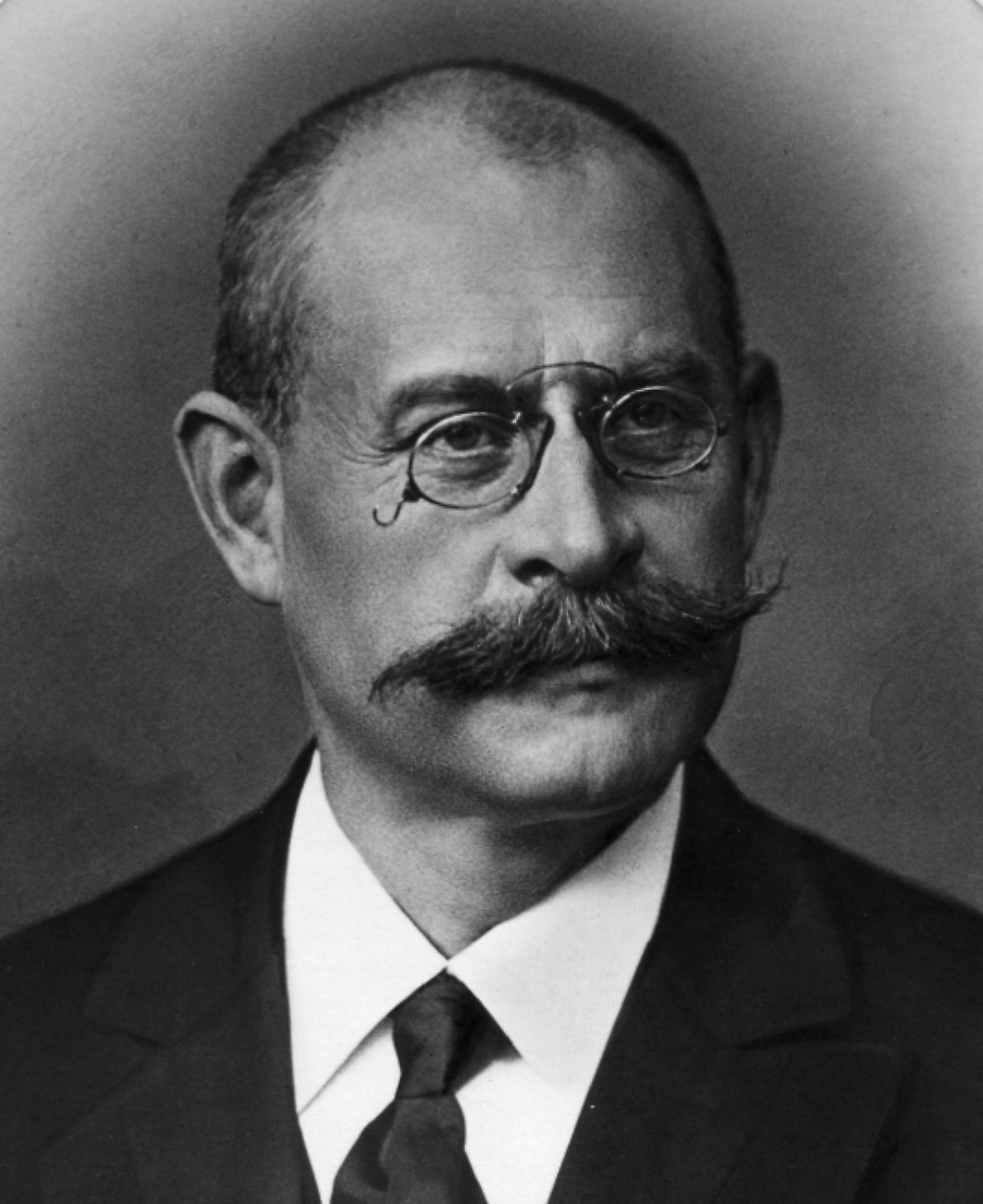
Georg Knorr (1859–1911)

The Kunze-Knorr brake (Kunze-Knorr-Bremse or KK-Bremse) is an automatic compressed-air brake for goods, passenger and express trains. It was the first graduated brake for goods trains in Europe. When it was introduced after the First World War, goods train brakes switched from hand operation to compressed-air in various European countries. The Deutsche Reichsbahn alone put the cost of equipping German goods wagons with Kunze-Knorr brakes between 1918 and 1927 at 478.4 million Reichsmarks. The operating cost savings from faster goods services and having fewer brakemen was assessed by the Reichsbahn at almost 96.3 million Reichsmark annually.

== Inventors ==
The Kunze-Knorr brake brought together the ideas of Prussian senior surveyor, Bruno Kunze (1854–1935), and preparatory work by the founder of Knorr-Bremse, Georg Knorr (1859–1911). It was the first, continuous, compressed-air brake that, even on long goods trains, enabled the brake force not only to be applied gradually, but also released again gradually. By combining a single-stage and a two-stage brake cylinder with a compound brake a significant increase in brake effort was achieved.

== Brake versions ==
Three versions of the brake were developed: for goods trains (KKgbr), passenger trains (KKpbr) and express trains (KKsbr). The goods wagon variant offered the option of switching between empty and loaded braking. The passenger train version was given an accelerator valve (Beschleunigungsventil) as well as a control valve. The express train brake had, in addition, a brake pressure regulator in order to prevent the wheels locking when braking quickly.

== Knorr-Bremse ==
The Kunze-Knorr brake was developed and manufactured by the firm of Knorr-Bremse AG in Berlin. It was also produced by their subsidiary company Süddeutsche Bremsen-AG at what is nowadays the head office of Knorr-Bremse AG in Munich. A total of about 550,000 Kunze-Knorr brake control valves were made, some under licence. In the 1930s they were superseded by the Hildebrand-Knorr brake (Hik brake). In many places, including the Deutsche Reichsbahn in East Germany, they were still regularly in use until the 1960s.

== Literature ==
Wilhelm Hildebrand, Die Entwicklung der selbsttätigen Einkammer-Druckluftbremse bei den europäischen Vollbahnen. Berlin 1927.

Jan-Henrik Peters, Personalpolitik und Rationalisierungsbestrebungen der Deutschen Reichsbahn-Gesellschaft zwischen 1924 und 1929. Frankfurt am Main u.a. 1996.

Jan-Henrik Peters, Rationalisierungsbestrebungen der Deutschen Reichsbahn-Gesellschaft zwischen 1924 und 1929, in: Zeitschrift für Unternehmensgeschichte 41, 1996, 187–200.

Manfred Pohl, Sicherheit auf Schiene und Straße. Die Geschichte der Knorr-Bremse AG. (engl. Ausgabe: Safety First by Road and Rail. The History of Knorr-Bremse AG.) München 2005.

== See also ==
- History of rail transport in Germany
