= German railway wagon classes =

The system of German railway wagon classes (Wagengattungen) was introduced in Germany in 1902 and 1905 by the Prussian state railways based on their system of norms, and was soon taken up by the other state railways (Länderbahnen). On the formation of the Deutsche Reichsbahn, the system became mandatory across the whole of Germany. In the course of the years more and more adjustments to it were made. It was finally replaced between 1964 and 1968 when the two German railway administrations - the Deutsche Bundesbahn and the Deutsche Reichsbahn (East Germany) - adopted the internationally standard UIC classifications for passenger coaches and goods wagons. Today, the system is still regularly being used for narrow gauge goods wagons, because these were not generally given UIC designations, as well as on many historical vehicles.

The wagon class comprises one or more main class letters (Hauptgattungszeichen) (in capitals, sometimes with lower case letters in between) and possibly several secondary class letters (Nebengattungszeichen) (always in lower case). Combinations of several main class letters are possible, e.g. on passenger coaches with different accommodation classes.

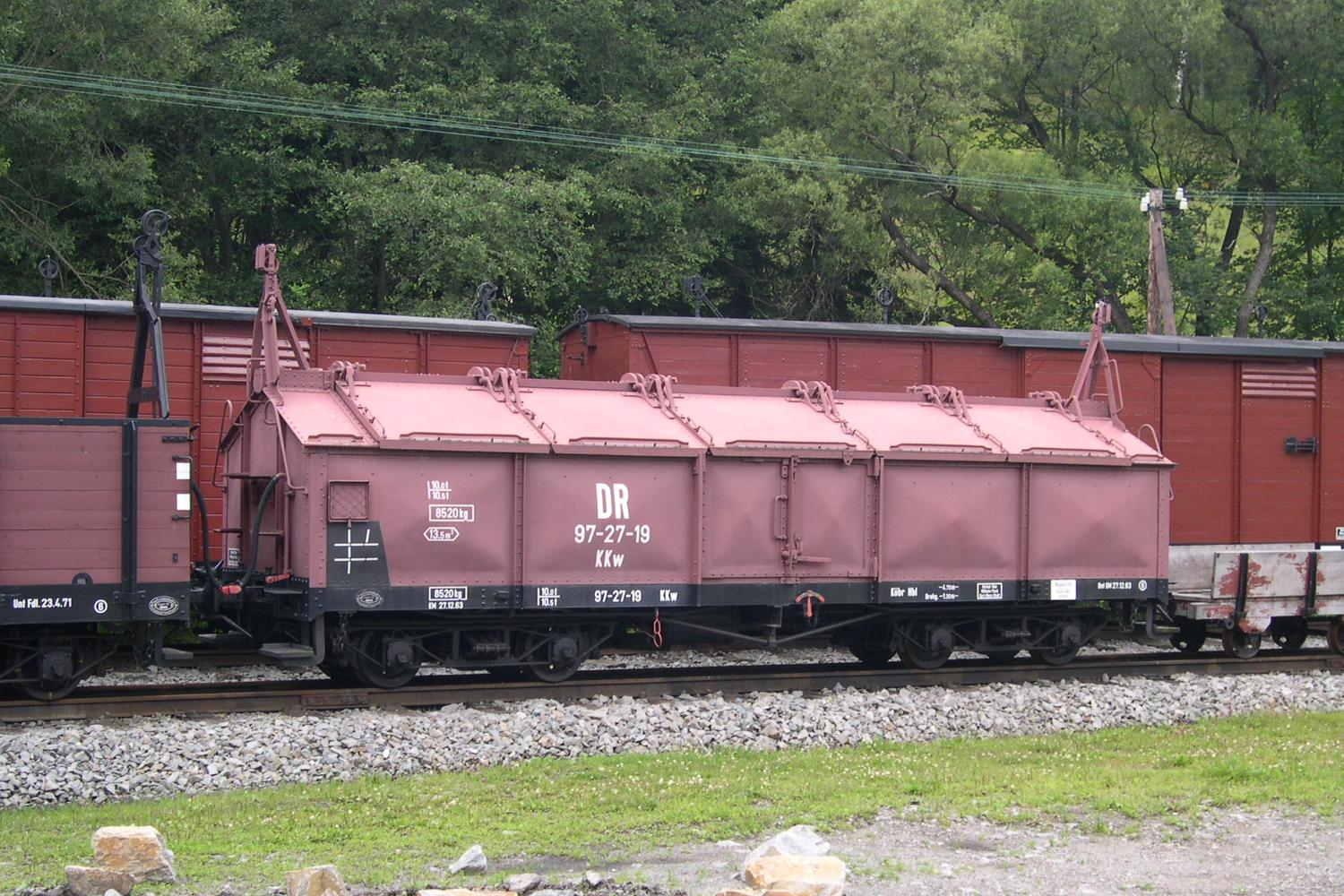
KKw = Lidded wagon with bogies and less than 30 t dead weight, here on the 750-mm gauge line of the Preßnitz Valley Railway

== Main class letters ==
In order to distinguish bogie wagons, the last letter of the main class was doubled to begin with, e.g. BC → BCC, G → GG (exceptions were the Post, Salon, Schlaf und Speise where there was no difference). From 1928 the system was changed on passenger coaches. Instead of doubling the letters, the number of axles was indicated where it was greater than two. So an eight-wheeled BC coach was no longer classified as a BCC but as a BC4. That now made it possible to distinguish passenger coaches with three axles or more. For goods wagons, the doubling of letters was retained. Only on Dgw and ZM wagons was the differentiation dropped, whilst the BT, H, Pwg, V and VO wagons had no bogie variants anyway.

	Period When Valid (if limited)	Meaning
A		Passenger coach 1st class
AD		Passenger coach 1st class with Luggage Compartment, specially designed for the Rheingold
B		Passenger coach 2nd class
BB	1928 to 1938	Former BC. 3rd class (C) compartments subsequently upholstered for 2nd class
BT	from ?	Groß Behälter-Tragwagen. Large container-carrying flat wagon.
C	to 1956	Passenger coach 3rd class
CC	1928 to 1938	Former CD. 4th class (D) compartments subsequently fitted with benches for 3rd class.
D	to 1928	Passenger coach 4th class
Dienst	from ?	Dienstwagen. Departmental wagon.
D...	from 1952 (DR)	Doppelstockwagen. Double-decker coach (only in combination with B, C, Pw)
DGB	from 1957 (DR)	Doppelstock-Gliederzug, 2nd class. Double-decker articulated train, 2nd class
DGR	from 1958 (DR)	Buffet car for the double-decker articulated train
Dgw	from ? (DB)	Dienstgüterwagen. Departmental wagon.
G		Gedeckter Güterwagen. Covered van.
HH	to 1923	Langholzwagenpaar. Log wagon pair.
H	from 1924	Cradle wagon. Type of Langholzwagen or log wagon.
K		Klappdeckelwagen. Lidded wagon.
K…	from ?	Narrow gauge passenger coach (only in combination with A, B, C, D, Pw, Post)
...K	from 1954 (DR)	Passenger coach with Küche (kitchen). (not in combination mit WL, WR)
...L	1933 to 1956	Lokalbahnwagen. Branch line coach. (only in combination with B, C, Pw, Post)
L...	from 1957 (DB)	Lokalbahnwagen. Branch line coach. (only in combination with B, C, Pw, Post)
...L	from 1956 (DB)	Liegewagen. Couchette coach.
...L(Z)	from 1954 (DR)	Coach with Lautsprechern für Zugfunk (loudspeakers for train communication).
M…	from 1943 (DR only to 1954)	Provisional wartime coach (only in combination with B, C, Pw)
M	from 1954 (DR)	Passenger coach of goods van design
M	from about 1957 (DR)	Militärwagen? Military van - a covered van with special equipment for carrying troops
N	1911 to 1921	Covered van or combination van with air brakes or pipes for use in fast trains
O		Offener Güterwagen. Open wagons.
P	to 1927	Packwagen. Luggage van (not used for passenger coaches with a luggage compartment which had secondary letter p instead, see below).
P	from 1928	Privatwagen. Private wagon.
Post		Postwagen. Post van (to 1927 not used for passenger and goods wagons with a post compartment, which had secondary letters post instead, see below).
Pw	from 1928	Gepäckwagen (Packwagen). Luggage van.
Pwg	from 1933	Gepäckwagen für Güterzüge. Luggage van for goods trains. Guards van.
R	from 1914	Rungenwagen. Stake wagon.
…R	from 1956 (DB)	Wagon with restaurant section (not in combination with WR)
S		Schienenwagen. Flat wagon (e.g. for carrying rails).
S...	from 1928 (DR only to 1945)	Sonderreisezugwagen (special passenger coach) for FD trains (only in combination with A, B, C, Post, Pw, WR).
...S	from 1954 (DR)	Sonderwagen. Special wagon.
Sdr	from 1945 (DR)	Sonderreisezugwagen. Special passenger coach.
Salon		Salonwagen. Saloon car.
Schlaf	to 1927	Schlafwagen. Sleeper.
Speise	to 1927	Speisewagen. Dining or restaurant car. (not used for passenger coaches with dining section, which used secondary letters speise instead, see below).
T	from 1943	Thermoswagen. Kühlwagen. Refrigerator van.
V		Verschlagwagen. Livestock van for small livestock e.g. sheep and poultry.
VO	to 1921	Offener Viehwagen. Open livestock wagon for large livestock, e.g. cattle and horses.
WG	from ? (DB)	Gesellschaftwagen. Company coach.
WL…	from 1928	Schlafwagen − "wagon-lit". Sleeper. (only in combination with A, B, C)
WR	from 1928	Speisewagen − "wagon-restaurant". Dining or restaurant car.
X		Departmental open wagon.
Z	from 1928	Zellenwagen. Prison van?
Z	from 1951 (DR)	Zisternenwagen. Tank wagon.
ZM	1945 to 1950	Tank wagon for the transportation of crude oil.

== Secondary letters for passenger coaches ==
	Period valid (if limited)	Meaning
b	from 1957 (DB)	With additional brake pipes (Bremsleitung) and electrical control wiring (omitted on railbus classes and with f)
c	from 1954 (DR)	Passenger coach of goods van design (only as Mci, previously MCi)
d	1928 to 1937	Former 4th class D, now used unchanged as a higher travel class
e	to 1927	Passenger coach with 2 decks (Etagen)
e	from 1954 (DR) from 1957 (DB)	Electric train heating (elektrischer Zugheizung) (DB: omitted with m)
(e)	from 1957 (DB)	Electric heating (elektrischer Heizleitung)
f	from 1957 (DB)	Driver's cab (Führerstand) on shuttle trains
g	to 1927	Luggage van only suitable for use in goods trains (Güterzüge) (only in combination with P)
g	1928 to 1956	Former covered van (gedeckter Güterwagen) form passenger transport (only as Dgi or Cgi)
g	from 1957 (DB)	Rubber communication walls (Gummiwülste) instead of bellows (only in combination with ü or y)
g	from 1962 (DR)	Rubber communication gangways (Gummiwulstübergängen)
k	1928 to 1953 (DR); 1928 to 1956 (DB)	Kitchen (Küche) (omitted on WL, WR)
kr	from 1928	Sick bay (Krankenabteil) or with compartment which can be converted into a sick bay
i		Through coach with open gangways
l	from 1957 (DB)	Light (leichte), eight-wheeled fast-stopping or passenger train coach of standard design with less than 30 t dead weight
m	from 1957 (DB)	Length over 24 m, upholstered 2nd class and electric heating or heating pipes
o	from 1954 (DR)	Stove heating (Ofenheizung)
p	to 1927	Passenger coach with luggage compartment (Gepäckraum)
post	to 1927	Passenger coach or luggage van with post (Post) compartment
r	from 1967 (DR)	Passenger coach with buffet facility
s	from 1957 (DB)	Closed side entrance (Seitengang) in 1st class or luggage van on WL: Sleeper with individual compartments, in combination with i or y:
speise	to 1927	Passenger coach with dining area (Speiseraum)
tr	from 1928	suitable for heavy hand luggage (Traglasten) or equipped with a heavy hand luggage section
u	1933 to 1937	Converted (umgerüstete) former 3rd class (C), now upholstered and operated as 2nd class (B) and former 4th class (D), now fitted with benches and operated as 3rd class (C)
ü		Bogie coach with corridor and bellows gangways (Faltenbalgübergängen) (for express train coaches)
üp	from 1939 (DB only to 1956)	Bogie coach with corridor and bellows gangways (Faltenbalgübergängen) (for passenger and fast-stopping train coaches
y	from 1957 (DB)	Bogie coach with corridor and bellows gangways (Faltenbalgübergängen) (for passenger and fast-stopping train coaches
v	1939 to ? from 1962 (DB)	Passenger coach with temporary wooden benches Priority compartments (Vorzugsabteile) (more legroom)
z	from 1962 (DB)	air conditioning

== Secondary letters for goods wagons ==
=== Description of the maximum load ===
==== Four- and six-wheeled wagons ====
	for Classes	Period valid	Meaning
m	all	to 1910	At least (mindestens) 15 ton maximum load
m	all	1911 to 1923	At least 15 ton but less than 20 ton maximum load
mm	all	1911 to 1923	At least 20 ton maximum load
m	G, H, K, O, R, S, V, X	from 1924	At least (from 1937 exactly) 20 ton maximum load
mm	G, K, O, R, X	from 1937	more than 20 ton maximum load
w	all	to 1923	Less than (weniger) 10 ton maximum load
w	G, H, O, S, T, V, X	from 1924	Less than 15 ton maximum load and not tippable

==== Wagons with eight wheels or more (including HH wagons) ====
	for Classes	Period valid	Meaning
m	GG, HH, OO, SS	to 1910	At least (mindestens) 20 ton maximum load
m	GG, HH, OO, SS	1911 to 1923	At least 30 ton maximum load
m	SS	1933 to 1950	At least 50 ton maximum load (omitted on SSt and SSy, see below)
m	SS	from 1950 (DB)	At least 35 ton maximum load (omitted on SSt and SSy, see below)
w	GG, HH, OO, SS	to 1923	Less than (weniger) 20 ton maximum load
w	GG, KK, OO	from 1924	Less than 30 ton maximum load
w	SS	from 1924	Less than 35 ton maximum load

=== Description of loading length and loading area ===
	for Classes	Period valid	Meaning
k	S	from 1924	Loading length shorter (kürzer) than 13 m
k	SS	from 1924	Loading length shorter than 15 m
l	all except SS	to 1910	At least 7 m loading length (Ladelänge) and 17 m^{2} loading area
l	all except R and SS	1911 to 1923	At least 8 m loading length
l	SS	to 1923	More than 12 m loading length (Ladelänge)
l	SS	1924 to 1932	More than 15 m loading length (omitted on SSt und SSy, see below)
l	SS	from 1933	More than 18 m loading length (omitted on SSt und SSy, see below)
l	G	1924 to 1932	At least 24 m^{2} loading area (Ladefläche)
l	G	from 1933	At least 26 m^{2} loading area
l	K	from 1960 (DB)	At least 33 m^{2} loading area
l	O	from 1951	At least 10 m loading length (Ladelänge)
l	X	from 1951 (DB)	At least 8 m loading length

=== Description of features of importance for train formation ===
	for Classes	Period valid	Meaning
b	G, R, T	from 1933	Ferry wagons (Fährbootwagen) for German-English ferry services (with smaller loading gauge)
e	all	from 1924	Electric heating pipes (elektrischer Heizleitung)
ee	all	from 1933 (DR only to 1950)	Electric heating pipes (elektrischer Heizleitung) and electric heating (elektrischer Heizung)
f	all	1924 to 1932	Ferry wagons (Fährbootwagen) for German-English ferry services (with smaller loading gauge)
h	all except ZM	from 1924	Steam heating pipes (heizleitung)
hh	G, GG, T	from 1933	Steam heating pipes (heizleitung) and steam heating (Dampfheizung)
n	G, V, VO	to 1923	Air brakes or air pipes. Steam pipes or other equipment that make it suitable for use as a luggage van or in passenger trains (from 1911 some formed the main letter class N, see above)
q	all	from 1951 (DR)	no through couplings (0-0 wagon or 'Null-Null-Wagen'), maximum load reduced
r	all	from 1924	Wagon with exchangeable wheelsets for transiting to Russian (russische) 5 ft (1,524 mm) (omitted on SSy, see below)
s	G, R, SSy, T	1933 to 1950	Suitable for fast (schnell) trains running at up to 90 km/h
s	GG, RR, TT	1933 to 1950	Suitable for trains running at up to 120 km/h
s	G, R, SSy, T	from 1951 (DR)	Suitable for trains running at up to 100 km/h
s	GG, TT	from 1951 (DR)	Suitable for trains running at up to 120 km/h
s	all	from 1951 (DB)	Suitable for trains running at up to 100 km/h
u	X	to 1914	Unsuitable (untauglich) for trains used as public transport
[u]	O, HH, S/SS, X	to 1921	Unusable (unbrauchbar) for the loading of military vehicles
u	all	1939 to 1948	Unusuitable (ungeeignet) for military transportation
u	G	to 1948 (DB)	Unusuitable (ungeeignet) for passenger transportation
u	O	to 1948 (DB)	sides not removable? ('nicht abbordbar')

=== Description of individual wagon classes ===
==== Classes G/GG and N ====
	Period valid	Meaning
f	to 1923	Stalls for race horses (Luxuspferde)
g	from 1951 (DB)	Floor hatches for unloading bulk material
i	1911 to 1927 (?)	End platforms, suitable for passengers
k	1924 to 1944	Refrigerated (Kühleinrichtung) (from 1945 several formed the main letter class T, see above)
k	from 1951 (DR)	Refrigerator van (Kühlwagen), old type
ll	from 1933	Pair of close-coupled vans for part-load goods, known as a Leig-Einheit
p	from 1924 (DB only to 1950)	Six-wheeled, dead weight 16 tonnes (16 long tons; 18 short tons)
t	from 1924	End doors (Stirnwandtüren)
trieb	from 1933 to 1960	Goods railbuses (Gütertriebwagen) (all were left with the DB after the war)
v	1924 to 1932	End loading doors and special ventilation for livestock transportation (Viehbeförderung)
v	from 1933	Stable wagon with groom compartment
x	from 1951 (DR)	Fixed (internal?) walls for grain transportation

==== Class H/HH ====
	for Class	Period Valid	Meaning
o	H	from 1924 (DR only to 1950)	Without (ohne) Stakes, only usable in pairs
s	H/HH	to 1950	Coupling rods (Kuppelstangen)
z	HH	to 1923	Prongs (Zinken) on the rotating cradles

==== Classes K/KK, O/OO, VO and X/XX ====
	for Classes	Period Valid	Meaning
c	O	to 1910	Coke wagon (Cocswagen) with high sides in order to load the right amount of coke corresponding to the maximum load
c	O	from 1911	Maximum 15 ton load, wooden sides at least 1,30 m high but lower than 1,90 m
f	O/OO	from 1951	Rotating and folding drop ends for transporting vehicles (Fahrzeugbeförderung)
g	O	1924 to 1950	High, fixed rail sides (Gatterwänden)
g	K	from 1957 (DB)	Sliding sides
i	O/OO	from 1951 (DB)	Tippler (Muldenkippwagen)
k	O/OO	to 1923	Front walls (Kopfwänden) that pivot about an upper hinge and allow the load to be dumped onto tipping equipment
k	O	from 1933	Bucket car (Kübelwagen) with two or three removable buckets, 25 ton load
k	OO	from 1951 (DB)	Bucket car with four or five removable buckets
k	OO	from 1951 (DR)	Transporter for large containers
k	K	from 1951 (DB)	Crane (kranbar), sliding roof with crane loading and unloading
n	O/OO	from 1951 (DR)	Low (niedrige) sides, 40−80 cm high
o	X/XX	from 1914 (DR only to 1950)	Sides over 40 cm high
p	O/OO	from 1924	Not tippable, at least 15 t load, sides up to 1,90 m high
q	O/OO	to 1923	Removable end walls
t	K/KK, O/OO, X/XX	not limited	Funnels (Trichtern), floor hatches, inclined floors or side hatches for self-discharging, not tippable. X wagons additionally with removable end walls
v	O	from 1924	Wooden sides over 190 cm high, no tipping facility (ex main class VO, see above)
y	X	1914 to 1923	Special equipment for rapid loading and unloading etc.
z	O, VO	to 1923	Specially sealed, and so suitable for peat litter transportation or the like
z	O/OO	from 1933	Ore transportation (Erzbeförderung) with special sealing

==== Classes R/RR and S/SS ====
	for Classes	Period Valid	Meaning
a	SS	from 1933	Open brakeman's platform, folding platform rails
o	R	from 1933	No Stakes
Ru	Ol, Sl	1911 to 1913	At least 10 m long and with stakes (formed separate main letter class R from 1914, see above)
t	S/SS	from 1924	well wagon (Tiefladewagen)
y	SS	from 1942	Heavy goods flat wagon (Schwerlastwagen) with 50 t maximum load, loading length 8,8 m (with folded platform rails 9,5 m), open brakemans' platform, exchangeable wheelsets for 5 ft (1,524 mm) broad gauge
yl	RR; SS	from 1951 (DR) from 1951 (DB)	As for y, but longer loading length
ym	SS	from 1942	As for y, but higher maximum load (DR: > 50 t, DB from 1951: 80 t)
ym	RR	from 1951 (DR)	Heavy goods flat wagon with 80 t maximum load, loading length 14,36 m, open brakemans' platform, folding platform rails

==== Class T/TT ====
	Period Valid	Meaning
f	from 1943	Fish (Seefische) van only
g	from 1943	Refrigerated goods (Gefriergut) only
gg	from 1943	Refrigerated goods (Gefriergut) and dry ice only
k	from 1943 (DR)	Refrigerator van (Kühlmaschinenwagen)
k	from 1951 (DB)	k, an insulation value
kk	from 1951 (DB)	Insulated milk can van
n	from 1943	Not (nicht) suitable for refrigerated goods
o	from 1943	No (ohne) meat hooks
v	from 1943	Electric ventilators (Ventilatoren)

==== Class V ====
	Period Valid	Meaning
e	to 1910	with decks (Etagen)
e	1911 to 1921	Lattice walls and two floors
g	1911 to 1932	Intermediate floors for geese (Gänsebeförderung) (to 1921 always used in combination with e)
g	from 1933	Four floors
p	from 1922	No equipment to alter the loading area
z	to 1921	With equipment to alter the loading area

==== Class ZM ====
	Period Valid	Meaning
h	1945 to 1950	Heating pipes (Heizschlangen)
i	1945 to 1950	Insulation (Isolierung)
s	1945 to 1950	For black (schwarzer) crude oil
w	1945 to 1950	For white (weisser) crude oil

==== Class Z/ZZ ====
	Period Valid	Meaning
d	from 1951 (DR)	Heating pipes or tank
i	from 1951 (DR)	Interior (innerer) lining
w	from 1951 (DR)	Only for fuel

== Sources ==
- Helmut Behrends, Wolfgang Hensel, Gerhard Wiedau: Güterwagen-Archiv 1. transpress, Berlin 1989, ISBN 3-344-00184-1.
- Helmut Behrends, Wolfgang Hensel, Gerhard Wiedau: Güterwagen-Archiv 2. transpress, Berlin 1989, ISBN 3-344-00330-5 .
- Peter Wagner, Sigrid Wagner, Joachim Deppmeyer: Reisezugwagen 1. Sitz- und Gepäckwagen. transpress 1993, ISBN 3-344-70783-3.

== See also ==
- History of rail transport in Germany
- Open wagon
- Pocket wagon
