= DWV =

DWV may refer to:

- Deformed Wing Virus, a disease of honeybees
- Deutscher Staatsbahnwagenverband, the German railway wagon association formed in 1909
- Deutscher Wanderverband, the German Hiking Association
- Deutscher Wehrverein, the German Defence Union (1919-1935)
- Drain-Waste-Vent (DWV) system
- DWV, a Dutch football club from Amsterdam
- DWV (group), American pop group
