= Railway truck =

Railway truck may refer to:

- A covered goods wagon, British and Commonwealth usage
- A truck, US and Canadian usage
