= Covered goods wagon =

Enclosed railway wagon used to carry freight

In the United Kingdom, a covered goods wagon or covered goods van is a railway goods wagon which is designed for the transportation of moisture-susceptible goods and therefore fully enclosed by sides and a fixed roof. They are often referred to simply as covered wagons, and this is the term used by the International Union of Railways (UIC). Since the introduction of the international classification for goods wagons by the UIC in the 1960s a distinction has been drawn between ordinary and special covered wagons. Other types of wagon, such as refrigerated vans and goods wagons with opening roofs, are closely related to covered wagons from a design point of view. Similar freight cars in North America are called boxcars. (Note: An exception in Australia was the former South Australian Railways, which adopted US practices and terminologies; it used the term "boxcar".)

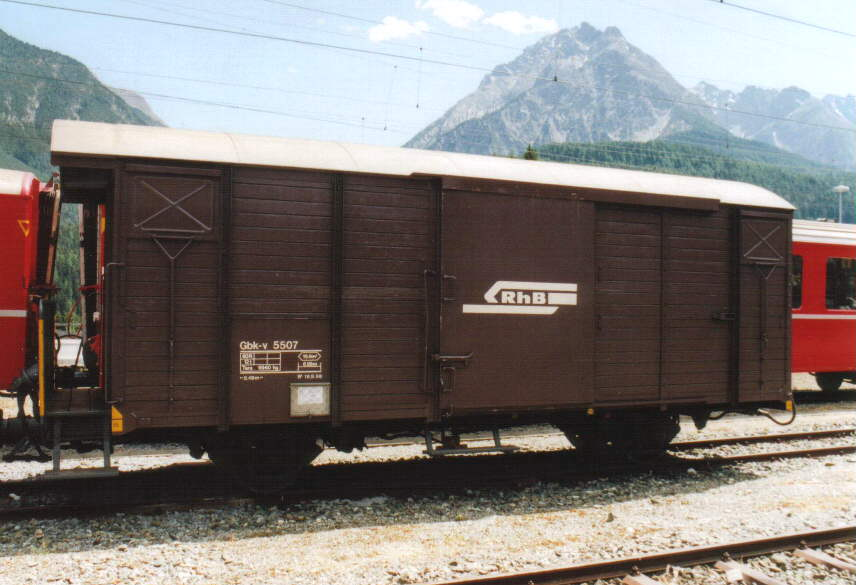
Ordinary covered wagon with central side door on the Rhaetian Railway in Switzerland

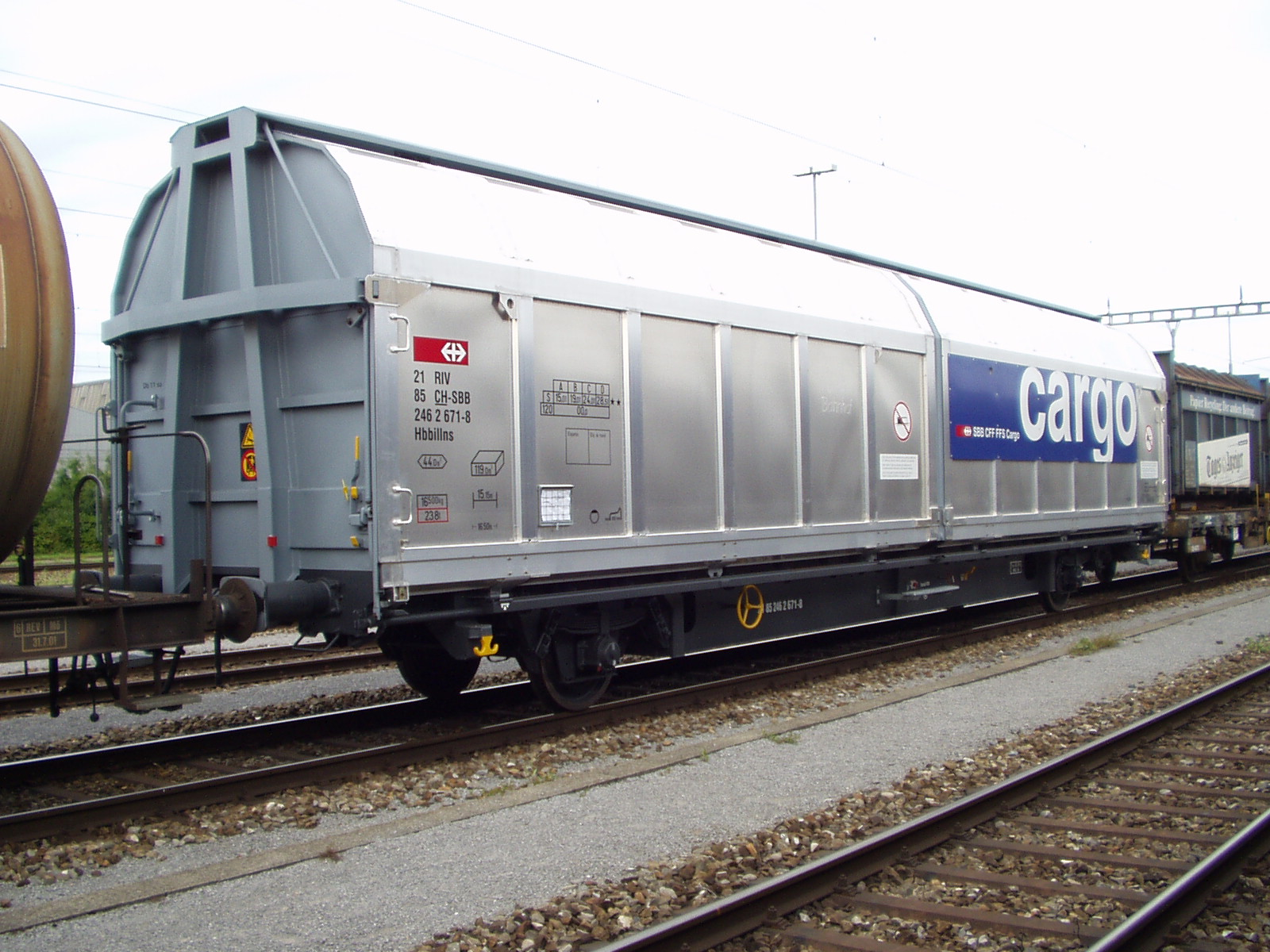
Swiss (SBB) Hbbillns sliding wall wagon, a present-day standard for palettised goods with lockable and movable partitions

Covered goods wagons for transporting part-load or parcel goods are almost as old as the railway itself. Because part-load goods were the most common freight in the early days of the railway, the covered van was then the most important type of goods wagon and, for example, comprised about 40% of the German railways goods fleet until the 1960s. Since then however the open wagon and flat wagon have become more common. By contrast the covered goods wagon still forms the majority of two-axled wagons in countries like Germany, because the comparatively light freight does not routinely require the use of bogie wagons.

The formerly widespread ordinary covered wagon with side doors was almost fully displaced in the third quarter of the 20th century by special covered wagons with sliding walls which can be rapidly loaded and unloaded with palletised goods using fork-lift trucks.

== UIC ordinary covered wagons ==
During the 1950s the International Union of Railways developed a standard design for covered goods wagons. This has 8 ventilation hatches and is therefore suitable for the transportation of cattle. Since then, European railways have procured covered wagons which at least match the main dimensions of this standard, but otherwise have minor variations. For example, there are wagons with different axle bases or a different number of ventilation hatches. The body is of a mainly wood and steel compound construction. Refrigerated vans were also developed, based on the long, twin-axled types (Gbs and Hbfs).

The following table contains details of the UIC ordinary covered wagon according to Behrends because this is the single available source with systematic specifications. Other sources may differ in some respects from this; in particular the door height has not been clarified beyond doubt. It is also unclear to what extent the present-day, twin-axled, sliding wall wagons were standardised.

	UIC 571-1: Ordinary class two axles			UIC 571-2: Ordinary class four axles		UIC 571-3: Special class
Type	Type 1 (long)	Ferryboat wagon	Type 2 (short)	Type 1 (short)	Type 2 (long)	Covered wagon with sliding walls; four axles
Class	Gbs	Hbfs	Gs	Gas(s)	Gabs(s)	Habiss
Axle base	8.00 m (26 ft 3 in)		6.00 m (19 ft 8 1/4 in)	−		
Bogie pivot pitch	−			11.48 m (37 ft 8 in)	16.66 m (54 ft 7 7/8 in)	
Length over buffers	14.02 m (46 ft 0 in)		10.58 m (34 ft 8 1/2 in)	16.52 m (54 ft 2 3/8 in)	21.70 m (71 ft 2 3/8 in)	
Loading length, min.	12.70 m (41 ft 8 in)		9.26 m (30 ft 4 5/8 in)	15.20 m (49 ft 10 3/8 in)	20.41 m (66 ft 11 1/2 in)	2 m × 8.67 m (6 ft 6 3/4 in × 28 ft 5 3/8 in)
Loading area, ca.	33 m^{2} (360 sq ft)	28 m^{2} (300 sq ft)	25 m^{2} (270 sq ft)	40 m^{2} (430 sq ft)	53 m^{2} (570 sq ft)	50 m^{2} (540 sq ft)
Loading volume, ca.	88 m^{3} (3,100 cu ft)	63 m^{3} (2,200 cu ft)	67 m^{3} (2,400 cu ft)	105 m^{3} (3,700 cu ft)	137 m^{3} (4,800 cu ft)	131 m^{3} (4,600 cu ft)
Unladen weight, max.	14.5 t (14.3 long tons; 16.0 short tons)		12.5 t (12.3 long tons; 13.8 short tons)	23.0 t (22.6 long tons; 25.4 short tons)	29.0 t (28.5 long tons; 32.0 short tons)	
Door height	2.15 m (7 ft 5/8 in)	2.00 m (6 ft 6 3/4 in)	2.15 m (7 ft 5/8 in)			−
Door width	2.50 m (8 ft 2 3/8 in)				4.00 m (13 ft 1 1/2 in)	−

== Class G – Ordinary covered wagons ==
The UIC's ordinary covered wagon class has rigid, fixed walls with sliding doors on each side. The upper third of the side walls has closable openings of various types. These may be designed as ventilation openings, loading hatches or combined ventilation and loading hatches. Today, Class G wagons have been largely superseded by other classes.

The transportation of part-load goods that are susceptible to the weather in boxes, sacks and barrels is the main function of G class wagons. One disadvantage they have is that the single side door does not facilitate rapid loading and unloading of large unit loads. The demand for G wagons fell with the increasing use of intermodal freight transport. Today the majority of part-load goods are moved in ISO containers, for which special flat wagons are available. Where there is a requirement for the direct loading of part-load goods, wagons with sliding sides are preferred (see below), because they enable a faster transfer of pallets.

G wagons were also frequently filled with bulk materials that were vulnerable to the weather. Special wall attachments were developed, especially for the transportation of grain, with which the side doors could be closed. Today there are self-discharging wagons with opening roofs available for this type of freight that are quicker to load and unload.

G wagons were often attached to passenger trains in order to transport express goods and post. Special variants were sometimes used that, for example, were fitted with suitable braking equipment or heating pipes.

G wagons were also used frequently for the transportation of cattle. This required good ventilation, which is why wagons were initially fitted with four, later eight, ventilation openings.

== Class H – Special covered wagons ==
=== Older wagons grouped into class H ===
These wagons were based on the standard covered wagon but developed for special roles and were always built in smaller numbers. All types were still around for the introduction of the UIC classification in the 1960s, but were classed as special wagons due to certain special features and retired almost completely by the end of the 20th century.

==== Livestock wagons ====
- German wagon classes: to 1921 Ve…, from 1922 V…
- UIC classification: H…e…

Whilst ordinary open or covered goods wagons were used for the transportation of cattle and other large animals, special livestock wagons were being developed for small livestock as early as the 19th century. Optimal use of the roughly 2 metre high loading volume was made by loading domestic pigs, goats and sheep on two levels. Some wagons could have intermediate floors fitted for transporting poultry.

The design was closely based on contemporary covered wagons. Externally the most noticeable feature of these mainly twin-axled livestock vans were the slatted sides guaranteeing good ventilation. Dividing walls on many types of livestock van enabled a vertical division of the loading space. In the side walls there were feeding and air flaps, the number of which corresponded to the number of compartments.

Livestock vans were built for the German state railways in state classes, Verbandsbauart and Austauschbauart types. After the Second World War the majority of the remaining ones were considerably rebuilt by the DB. Today there are no livestock vans left in service, because animals can be transported at higher speed and with greater flexibility by road.

==== Wagons with end doors ====
- German wagon classes: G…t…
- UIC classification: H…c…

Variants of the covered goods wagon were also built with end doors from the 1920s to the 1960s. These were, in particular, the Austauschbauart Dresden class wagons, the Kriegsbauart four-axled wagons of the Bromberg class and their successors in the DR as well as a batch of 600 Umbauwagen for the DB.

The original role of these vehicles was the transport of new, mostly open-topped wagons. But by the end of the 20th century there was no longer any significant demand for this type of wagon. However, one remaining sphere of work is, for example, the transportation of the elephants for Circus Knie in special Hcks wagons belonging to the Swiss Federal Railways.

==== Leig units ====
- German wagon classes: Gll…
- UIC classification: H…−…z

The Leig units were permanently coupled pairs of covered wagons that appeared in the ranks of the Deutsche Reichsbahn from the 1920s, mainly from existing covered wagon stock.

==== Ferry wagons ====
- German wagon classes: Gf…, later Gb…
- UIC classification: H…f…

Covered goods wagons designed for goods services to Great Britain have to comply with the smaller loading gauge in the United Kingdom and therefore had less loading volume than the equivalent wagon for services on continental Europe. The wagons with individual sliding doors have also been replaced by modern sliding wall wagons. In Germany these vehicles were formerly designated as ferry wagons (Fährbootwagen).

=== Sliding-wall wagons ===
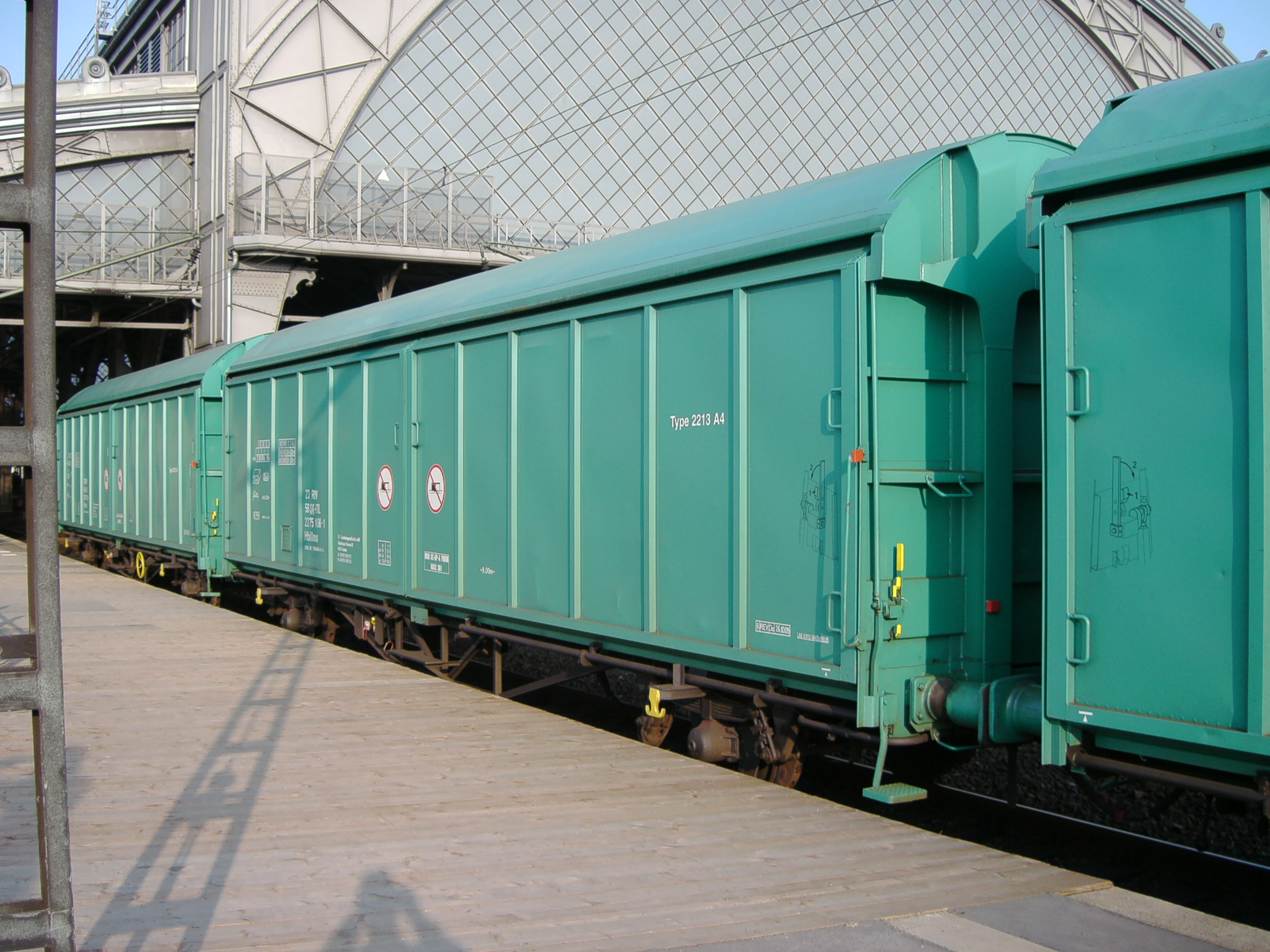
Hbillns sliding-wall wagon in the green livery of the ITL railway (equivalent to the DB's Hbillns^{302}).

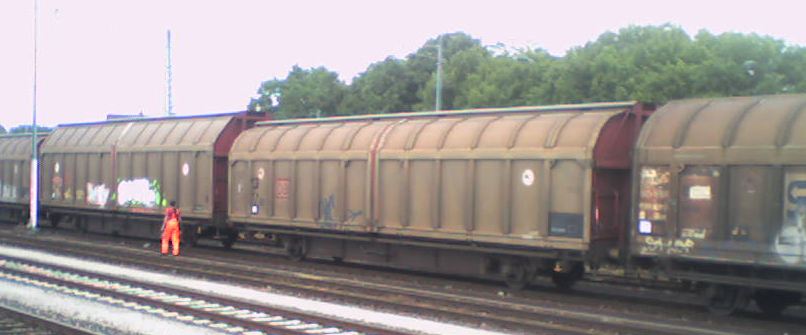
German (DB) sliding-wall vans with 46.4 m^{2} (499 sq ft) loading area and various body heights for different loading gauges: Class Hbbillns^{310} (in front) and Hbbillns^{311} (behind)

- German wagon classes: K…g…
- UIC classification: H…i…

The present-day standard wagon for moisture-susceptible palletised goods has sliding sides rather than fixed side walls, which enables access to the entire loading area for loading and unloading. These wagons with sliding walls or sides did not evolve from the original covered wagon, but were derived in the 1950s from wagons with sliding roofs and sides, which is why they used to be grouped in Class K.

The DB has over 15,000 sliding-roof wagons. Wagons built up to the early 1980s have a loading area of 34.1 m^{2} (367 sq ft) without partitions and can take a maximum of 30 Europool pallets (code letter b). On the more recent types were the dimensions were optimised: on 41.0 m^{2} (441 sq ft) of loading area (without partitions) up to 40 Europool pallets can be carried (Code letter bb).

In addition to making best use of the loading area there has been a trend towards large-volume wagons, which make maximum use of the available loading gauge. However they need to take account of the fact that in many countries the permitted loading gauge varies and this reduces the interoperability of this vehicle. The wagons cleared for use in Great Britain have a very small loading gauge and are distinguished by the code letters f, ff or fff. Other countries with small loading gauges include Switzerland, something which needs to be borne in mind for trains transiting the country e.g. between Germany and Italy.

Sliding-wall wagons are often fitted with partitions that prevent the goods sliding back and forth in the wagon (code letter l) and some are lockable (code letter ll). This is particularly useful if the wagon is not fully laden. However the use of partitions reduces the available loading area.

== Historical development ==
=== Germany ===
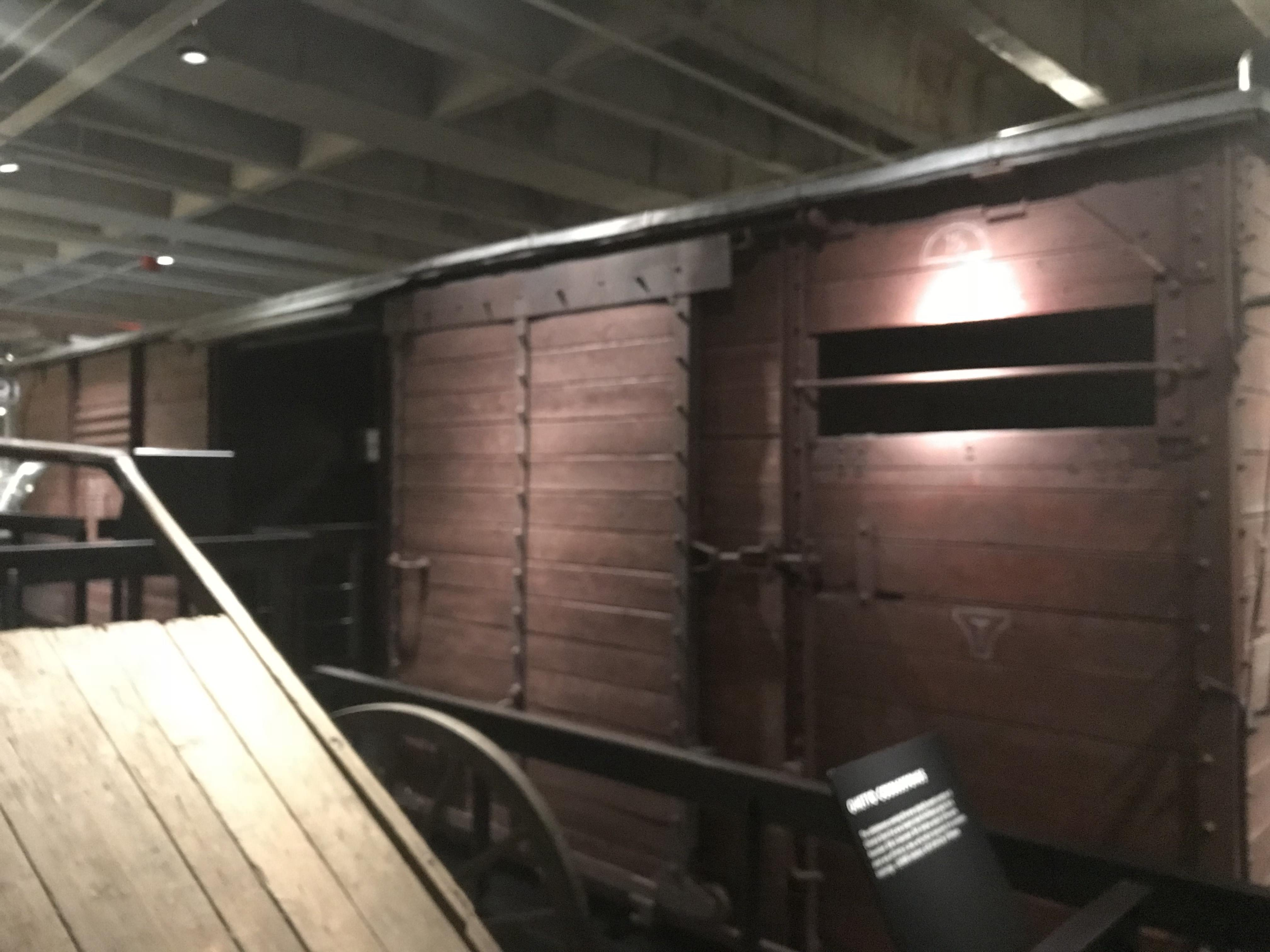
Cattle wagon of the type used in Holocaust trains

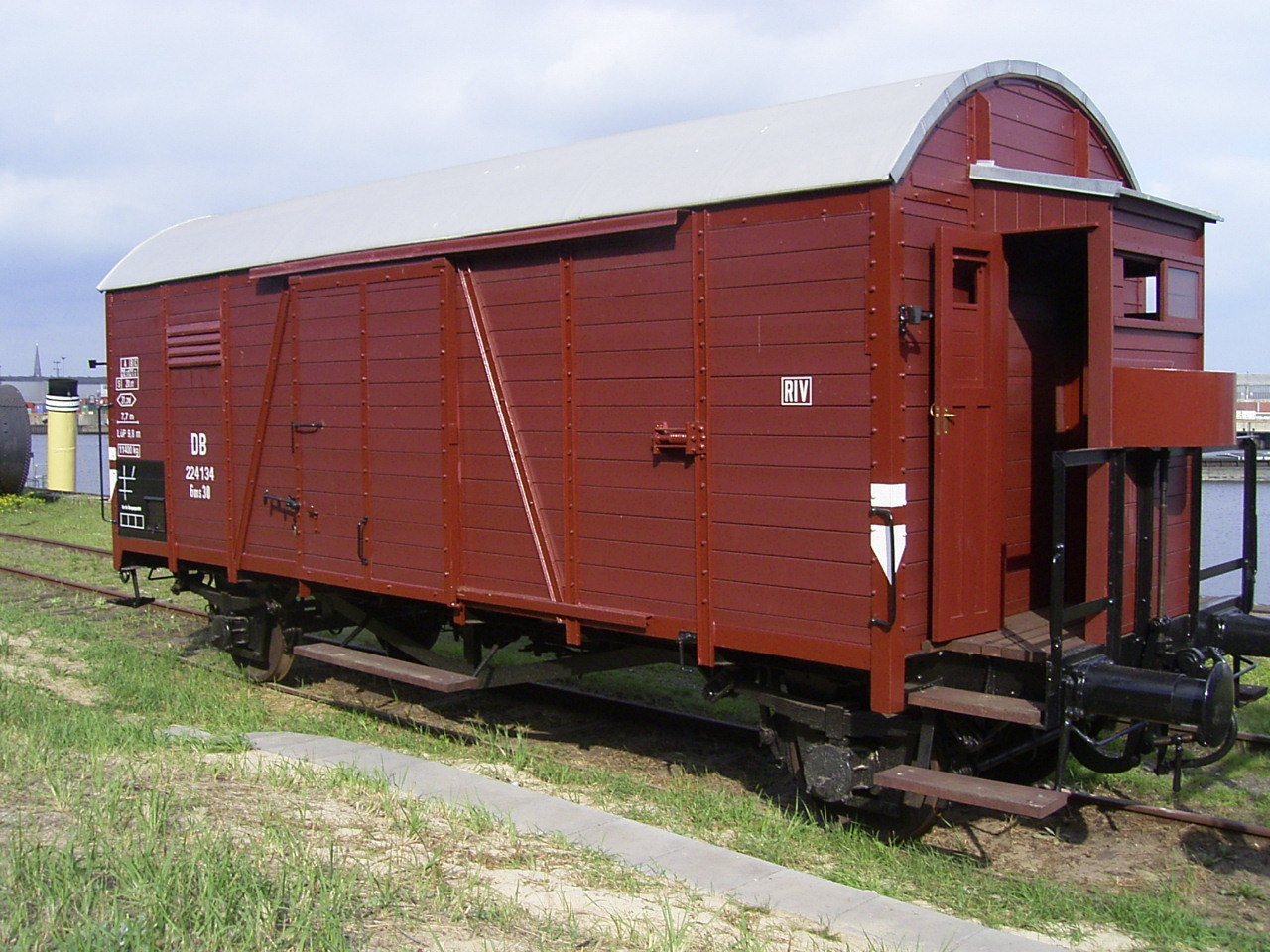
Oppeln class covered wagon (second, short variant of 1937 with 6 m (19 ft 8 1/4 in) axle base)

To begin with, the largely privately owned railway companies within the German Empire in the 19th century procured wagons to their own requirements. However, after the nationalisation of the majority of private railways into the state railway (the Länderbahnen) designs were standardised and the Länderbahn classes emerged.

The growth in trade between the various German-speaking states led to attempts to standardise their vehicle fleets. Initially wagons were produced to the same dimensions and, in 1910, the German State Railway Wagon Association (Deutsche Staatsbahnwagenverband) was formed. They developed standard goods wagon designs, the so-called Verbandsbauart wagons, that were procured in large numbers by the German state railways and other private and foreign railways well into the 1920s. For covered wagons there was the Class A2 wagon with a 15 t (14.8 long tons; 16.5 short tons) maximum load and 21.3 m^{2} (229 sq ft) loading area built to a standard template, and the large-volume covered wagon based on template A9, also with a 15 t (14.8 long tons; 16.5 short tons) maximum load, but a 21.3 m^{2} (229 sq ft) loading area.

In the 1920s, wagons with interchangeable parts, the Austauschbauart wagons, were developed for the Deutsche Reichsbahn (DRG). They had similar overall dimensions, but were clearly built to a different design from their forebears. Once again there was a covered wagon with 21.3 m^{2} (229 sq ft) loading area, classed as the Gr Kassel and a large-volume wagon with 29.4 m^{2} (316 sq ft) loading area, called the Gl Dresden. In addition, the Austauschbau series saw two new wagon classes being developed. The Glt Dresden was largely similar in design to the "standard" Gl Dresden, but had end doors. These vans were bought to provide sheltered transport for motor vehicles. A second, newer type of wagon was the ferry wagon developed during the 1920s for rail ferry services to Great Britain. This wagon had the same length over buffers as the Gl Dresden, but a loading area of only 22.4 m^{2} (241 sq ft), because of its narrower wagon body constrained by the smaller loading gauge of British railways. This was designated as the Gfh Trier.

The next significant change was the introduction in the 1930s of welding into the construction of railway vehicles. The designs of the Austauschbauwagen were reworked to take advantage of welding technology. As a result, a successor to the Gr Kassel emerged: the Ghs Oppeln with a 21.3 m^{2} (229 sq ft) loading area. The designs of the Gl Dresden and Glt Dresden were also reworked whilst retaining the same loading area of 29.4 m^{2} (316 sq ft)² (Glrhs). The Gfh Trier was also redesigned, but due to low demand this was not ready until 1940, and no more were built owing to the Second World War.

The next stage of development was forced as a result of the Second World War. In order to save material and labour, railway vehicle designs were simplified. As covered wagons the Gmhs Bremen appeared as a successor to the Ghs Oppeln, and the Glmhs Leipzig followed the Gl Dresden. These so-called wartime classes (Kriegsbauart) were also welded, and had loading areas of 23.6 m^{2} (254 sq ft) and 29.1 m^{2} (313 sq ft) respectively. More robust variants of these wagon classes were procured after the war by the Deutsche Bundesbahn and the Austrian Federal Railways (ÖBB).

=== Passenger use ===
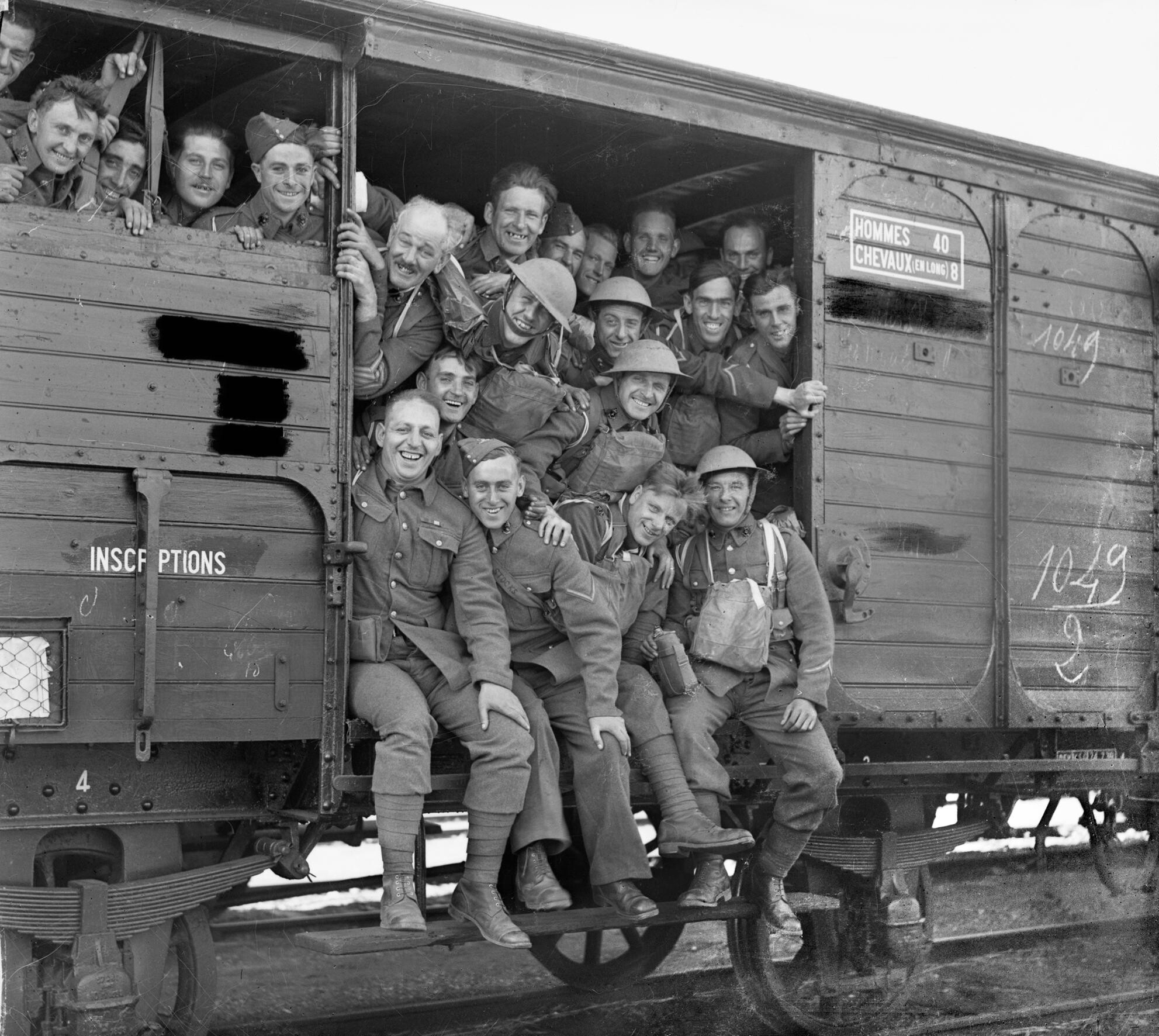
British soldiers on board a quarante et huit wagon in France in 1939. The stencilled sign in the top right of the picture says "HOMMES 40 : CHEVAUX (en long) 8", meaning "Men 40 : Horses 8"

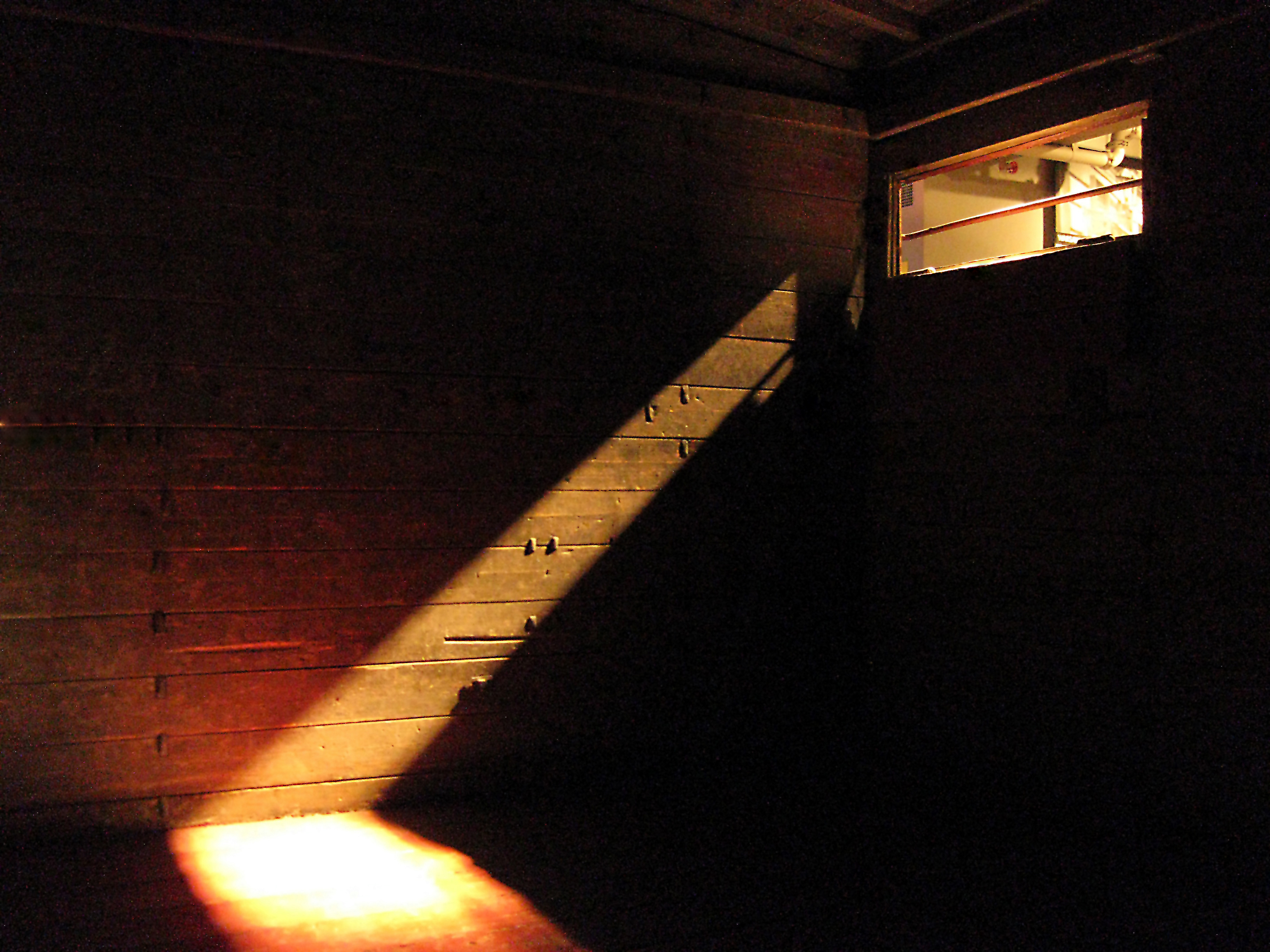
Interior of a covered goods wagon used to transport Jews and other Holocaust victims, the United States Holocaust Memorial Museum in Washington, D.C.

The covered goods wagon has been used to carry passengers, especially during wartime. In both world wars, French boxcars known as forty-and-eights (40/8) were used as troop transports as well as for freight; in World War II first by the French forces, then the German, and finally the Allies. The shared experience among Allied soldiers spawned groups such as the Forty and Eight veterans organization. In addition to soldiers, the Germans transported prisoners in crowded boxcars during the Nazi regime, and an undisclosed number of German soldiers captured by the U.S. Army died of suffocation in American boxcars transporting them from the front-line to prisoner of war camps in March 1945. The same transportation was used by the Soviet Union during the 1930s and 1940s, when over 1.5 million people were transferred to Siberia and other areas from different countries and areas incorporated into the Soviet Union.

=== The UK 'Van' ===
Historically the open wagon was the most common type of vehicle used for general merchandise traffic in Britain, with covered wagons ('goods vans') being used for specific types of goods requiring greater protection. Most wagons were 'unfitted' (i.e. not equipped with continuous brakes), the exceptions being wagons used on express goods traffic. However, British Railways' fleet modernisation during the 1950s resulted in vans being used for a much higher proportion of merchandise traffic, and the fitting of vacuum brakes as standard. The typical British goods van of this period had a 10-foot (3.05 m) wheelbase and a payload of 12 long tons (13 short tons; 12 t). The most common types were general purpose 'ventilated vans' such as Vanfits, but there were numerous more specialised types:

- Vanfits were ventilated vans which were built in very large numbers and used for almost any type of goods.
- Vanwides were an improved version of the Vanfit, built with wider doors for easier loading and unloading. Some of these eventually received air brakes and lasted into the early 1990s, by which time they were the last traditional short-wheelbase vans in regular traffic.
- Palvans were designed for palletised loads and loading by forklift truck. Whereas most vans had small doors centrally positioned on the van sides, Palvans had large doors half the width of the wagon on the left hand side of each side (i.e. diagonally opposite each other). Although palletisation was the future, these early Palvans were found to be very sensitive to unbalanced loads and prone to derailment at higher speeds.
- Shocvans and Palshocvans (a.k.a. Palvan Shocks) were the shock-absorbing equivalents of Vanfits and Palvans. Shock wagons were used to transport fragile goods which were at risk of being broken as a result of heavy shunting or other jolts whilst in transit; this was especially important for eggs and pottery. The van bodies were about 10 in (254 mm) shorter in length than the chassis and were mounted to the chassis via springs which absorbed some of the shock of sudden jolts.
- Insulated Vans (for meat), Meat Vans (ventilated for fresh meat), Insulfish vans (insulated for fish traffic – these had longer wheelbases so that they could be operated at higher speeds), Fruit Vans (ventilated vans for fruit traffic) and Banana Vans (unventilated and fitted with steam heating apparatus to warm and ripen the load, which was picked before ripening) were all specialist types for specific types of perishable goods traffic.
- Gunpowder Vans were specially constructed vans for explosives. They were shorter in length and height than standard vans, and were double skinned.
- Mogos had doors in the van ends so that cars and similar loads could be driven/rolled into and out of the wagon.
- Cattle wagons were built for livestock traffic.
- Ferry Vans were larger vans fitted with securing points for train ferries, dual brakes (air and vacuum) and various other features for international use.

Construction of the traditional small vans ceased in 1962 due to declining traffic and a surplus of wagons. When construction of general merchandise vans resumed around 1970, these were the air-braked VAA/VBA/VCA/VDA family of 20 ft 9 in (6,325 mm) wheelbase vans. The last mass-produced merchandise vans built for British Rail were the 29 ft 6 in (8,992 mm) wheelbase VGA class sliding-wall vans of the early 1980s. Subsequent vans used in the UK have mostly been large (usually bogie) sliding-wall vans of continental design.

== See also ==
- Austauschbauart
- Covered goods wagons in wartime deportations
- Forty-and-eights - French covered wagons for 40 men or 8 horses in wartime
- General Utility Van – Enclosed railway wagon used by British Rail to carry mail and parcels
- Kangourou wagon
- Pocket wagon

== Sources ==
- Behrends H et al.: Güterwagen-Archiv (Band 2), Transpress VEB Verlag für Verkehrswesen, Berlin 1989.
- Carstens S et al.: Güterwagen (Band 1), MIBA-Verlag, Nürnberg 2000.
- Carstens S et al.: Güterwagen (Band 2), MIBA-Verlag, Nürnberg 2000.
