= German state railway norms =

Standards for railway vehicles in Germany

In German railway engineering, norms (Normalien) are standards for the design and production of railway vehicles. In the 1880s and 1890s, Prussian norms were developed for the locomotives, tenders and wagons of the Prussian state railways under the direction of the railway director responsible for railway engineering, Moritz Stambke. Later, these were largely adopted by the other state railways (Länderbahnen) in Germany.

== Engineering drawings ==
These norms are defined by engineering drawings to 1:40 scale on individual sheets and show the locomotives and wagons as full design drawings, referred to by their sheet (Musterblatt) numbers. The first drawings date from 1878. In 1885 the Minister for Public Works tasked the Hütte Academic Institute with the publication of the norms. The drawings were regularly updated as technical developments occurred. The last Prussian drawings were issued in 1923.

== Goods wagons ==
The design drawings for goods wagons were of special importance. The wagons built to these specifications appeared in large numbers and formed the bulk of the German wagon fleet until well after the Second World War. The 1973 DR Goods Wagon Handbook still contained most of the DSV wagon classes as well as the former Prussian Class II^{d} wagons. The most important types are listed in the following table. Note that group II^{b} are goods wagons based on old designs, II^{c} goods wagons under 15 ton maximum load and II^{d} goods wagons with at least 15 tons maximum load. A-group wagons are those built to the standard drawings of the DSV. Wagons according to sheets with other nos. are special designs, of which some were also built in large numbers.

Description	Sheet No.	Payload	State Railway Class		DRG Class from 1922	DB Class from 1952
Description	Sheet No.	Payload	to 1909/14	from 1909/14	DRG Class from 1922	DB Class from 1952
Goods van	8	10 t	Gl	G	Gw Magdeburg	–
Goods van	II^{b} 1	10 or 12.5 t	Gl	G	Gw Magdeburg	Gw 01
Goods van	II^{b} 3	15 t	Gml	Gm	G Hannover or Stettin	–
Goods van	II^{d} 8	15 t 10 t	Gml; Gnl	Gm; N	G Hannover/Stettin; Gwh Magdeburg	G 02 –
Goods van	A2	15 t	–	Gm, Nm	G(h) Kassel/München	G(h) 10
Goods van (facultative wagon) with end platforms for occasional passenger transport	II^{b} 1^{a}	10 t	Gnl	Ni	Giwh Magdeburg	–
Six-wheeled goods van for express goods	II^{c} 13	10, later 15 t	G(n)l	N	Gh Hannover	–
Six-wheeled goods van for express goods	II^{c} 13^{II}	6, later 15 t	G(n)wl	Nwl für Sz	Glpwhs Dresden	G(w)h(s) 05
Large-capacity goods van (container glass wagon)	Ce5	15 t	Gml	Gml	Gl Dresden	Gl 06
Large-capacity goods van (container glass wagon)	A9	15 t	–	Gml	Gl Dresden	Gl 11
Double-deck livestock van for small animals	II^{c} 1	10 t	Vel	Ven	Vpwh Altona	Vwh 04
Double-deck livestock van for small animals	II^{c} 1^{a}	10 t	Ve(n)lz	Venz	Vwh Altona	Vwh 04
Double-deck livestock van for small animals	II^{c} 1^{b}	10 t	Ve	Ven	Vpwh Altona	Vwh 03
Double-deck livestock van for small animals	II^{d} 10	15 t	Ve(n)mlz	Venmz	Vh Altona	Vh 04
Double-deck livestock van for small animals	A8	15 t	–	Venmz	Vh Altona	Vh 14
Livestock van for cattle and horses	II^{c} 2	10 t	V(n)l	Vn	Gvwh Magdeburg	–
Open livestock wagon for cattle and horses	II^{c} 3	10 t	VO(n)l	VO	Ovw Karlsruhe	−
Lidded wagon (lime wagon)	II^{c} 8	10 or 12.5 t	Kr	K	Kw Elberfeld	Kw 05
Lidded wagon (lime wagon)	II^{d} 4	15 t	Km	Km	K Elberfeld	K 06
Lidded wagon (lime wagon)	A7	15 t	–	Km	K Elberfeld	K 15
Open goods wagon sides 85 to 100 cm high, removable for military vehicle transport, end doors	10	10 t	Olk[u]	Ok[u]	Ow Karlsruhe, Xow Erfurt	–
Open goods wagon sides 85 to 100 cm high, removable for military vehicle transport, end doors	II^{b} 2	10 or 12.5 t	Olk	Ok	Ow Karlsruhe	–
Open goods wagon sides 85 to 100 cm high, removable for military vehicle transport, end doors	II^{d} 3	15 t	Omk	Omk	O Frankfurt/Würzburg	O 01
Open goods wagon sides 85 to 100 cm high, removable for military vehicle transport, end doors	A1	15 t	–	Omk	O Halle	O 10
Coal wagon sides 108 to 130 cm high, end doors	II^{c} 4	10 or 12.5 t	Ork	Ok	Ow Karlsruhe	–
Coal wagon sides 108 to 130 cm high, end doors	II^{c} 5	10 or 12.5 t	Ork[u]	Ok[u]	Ow Karlsruhe	–
Coal wagon sides 108 to 130 cm high, end doors	II^{d} 1	15 t	Omk[u]	Omk[u]	O Schwerin	O 02
Coal wagon sides 108 to 130 cm high, end doors	A6	15 t	–	Omk[u]	O Nürnberg	O 11
Coke wagon sides 140 to 155 cm high, end doors	II^{c} 7	10 or 12.5 t	Oclk[u]	Ock[u]	Ocw Münster	–
Coke wagon sides 140 to 155 cm high, end doors	II^{d} 2	15 t	Ocmlk[u]	Ocmk[u]	Oc Münster	Oc 01
Coke wagon sides 140 to 155 cm high, end doors	II^{d} 2^{III}	20 t	Omlk[u]	Ommk[u]	Om Ludwigshafen	Om 04
Coke wagon sides 140 to 155 cm high, end doors	A10	20 t	–	Ommk[u]	Om Breslau/Essen	Om 12
Coal wagon sides 150 to 180 cm high, end doors	Cc7	20 t	Omk[u]	Ommk[u]	Om Ludwigshafen	Om 04
Coal wagon sides 150 to 180 cm high, end doors	Ce93, Ce95	20 t	Omk[u]	Ommk[u]	Om Ludwigshafen	Om 04
Coal wagon sides 150 to 180 cm high, end doors	Ce146	20 t	–	Ommk[u]	Om Ludwigshafen	Om 04
Bogie coal wagon sides 130 cm high, end door	II^{d} 7 (1st use)	30 t	OOmk	OOmk	OO Oldenburg	–
Coal hopper wagon	II^{c} 6	10 t	Otr[u]	Ot[u]	Otw Mainz	–
Coal hopper wagon	II^{c} 12	12.5 t	Otr[u]	Ot[u]	Otw Mainz	–
Long low wagon with wooden stanchions	II^{c} 10	10 or 12.5 t	Sl	R	Rw Stuttgart	Rw 01
Long low wagon with wooden stanchions	II^{d} 5	15 t	Sml	Rm	R Stuttgart	R 02
Long low wagon with wooden stanchions	A4	15 t	–	Rm	R Stuttgart	R 10
Flat wagon (rail wagon); 13 m loading length	Ce143	15 t	Sml	Sml	S Augsburg	S 05
Flat wagon (rail wagon); 13 m loading length	A11	15 t	–	Sml	S Augsburg	S 14
Bogie flat wagon (rail wagon); 12 to 18 m loading length	II^{c} 9	20, later 25 t	SS	SS	SSkw Köln	–
Bogie flat wagon (rail wagon); 12 to 18 m loading length	II^{d} 6	30, later 35 t	SSm	SSm	SSk Köln	SSk 07
Bogie flat wagon (rail wagon); 12 to 18 m loading length	II^{d} 6^{a}	30, later 35 t	SSml	SSml	SSk Köln	SSk 07
Bogie flat wagon (rail wagon); 12 to 18 m loading length	II^{d} 7	30, later 35 t	SSml	SSml	SSk Köln	SSk 08
Bogie flat wagon (rail wagon); 12 to 18 m loading length	II^{d} 7^{II}	35 t	–	SSml	SS Köln	SS 08
Bogie flat wagon (rail wagon); 12 to 18 m loading length	A3	35 t	–	SSml	SS Köln	SS 15
Bogie flat wagon (rail wagon); 12 to 18 m loading length	Ce168	38 t	–	SSml	SSl Köln	SSl 16
Single bolster wagon (timber truck)	II^{c} 11	10 t	HHrsz	Hsz	Hosw Regensburg	–
Single bolster wagon (timber truck)	II^{d} 9	15 t	HHmrsz	Hmsz	Hos Regensburg	–
Single bolster wagon (timber truck)	A5	18, later 15 t	–	Hrmz	H Regensburg	H 10

== Other examples ==
Other examples of Prussian norms are:

Pwg Pr 92c	Sheet II^{a} 3
Bogies	Sheet VI^{d} 7^{II}
Diamond bogie Verbandsbauart	Sheet B23
S 6 (straight driver's cab end wall)	Sheet XIV-2a
G 3	Sheet 15, 16, III-3
T 9.1	Sheet III-4f
T 10	Sheet XIV-4b
Tender 4T18	Sheet III-5e
Tender 4T21,5	Sheet III-5h
Tender 4T21,5	Sheet III-5l
Tender 4T31,5	Sheet III-5m

== See also ==
- History of rail transport in Germany

== Literature and sources ==
- Multiple authors (1974). Güterwagen Handbuch, Transpress VEB Verlag für Verkehrswesen, Berlin
- Behrends, H.; Hensel, W.; Wiedau, G. (1989). Güterwagen-Archiv (Band 1), Transpress VEB Verlag für Verkehrswesen, Berlin
- Carstens, S.; Ossig, R. (1989). Güterwagen. Band 1. Gedeckte Wagen, W. Tümmels, Nuremberg
- Carstens, S.; Diener H. U. (1989). Güterwagen. Band 2. Gedeckte Wagen – Sonderbauarten, W. Tümmels, Nuremberg
- Carstens, S.; Diener H. U. (1996). Güterwagen. Band 3. Offene Wagen, Eigenverlag, Hasloh
- Carstens, S. (2003). Güterwagen. Band 4. Offene Wagen in Sonderbauart, MIBA-Verlag, Nuremberg
- Carstens, S. (2008). Güterwagen. Band 5. Rungen-, Schienen- und Flachwagen, MIBA-Verlag, Nuremberg
- Deutsche Bundesbahn, EZA Minden (1951). Handbuch für Umzeichnung der Güterwagen, Minden
- Deutsche Reichsbahn-Gesellschaft, Reichsbahn-Zentralamt (1928) Merkbuch für die Fahrzeuge der Reichsbahn. IV. Wagen (Regelspur). 1928 edition, Berlin
- Königl. Eisenbahn Zentralamt (1915). Merkbuch für die Fahrzeuge der Preußisch-Hessischen Staatseisenbahnverwaltung. 1915 edition, Berlin
- Troche, H. (1992) Die preußischen Normal-Güterzuglokomotiven der Gattungen G 3 und G 4. Kap. 17. Die Normalien-Güterwagen, EK-Verlag, Freiburg
