= Refrigerated van =

Refrigerated railway wagon

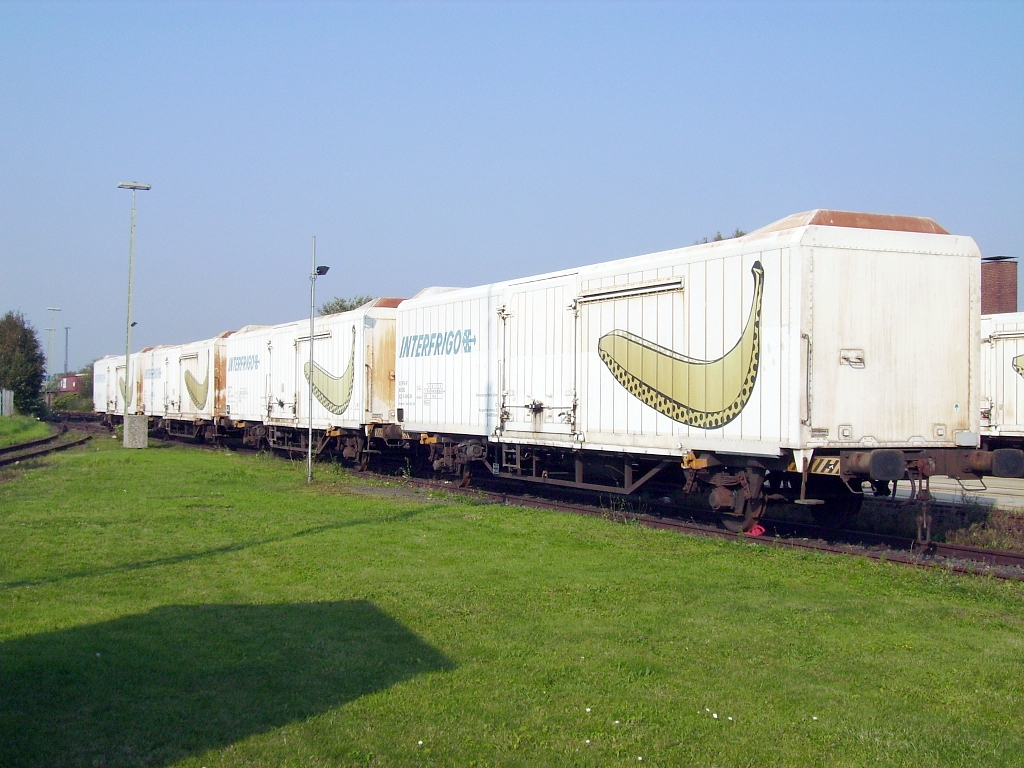
Refrigerator van for the transportation of bananas

A refrigerated van (also called a refrigerated wagon) is a railway goods wagon with cooling equipment. Today they are designated by the International Union of Railways (UIC) as Class I.

== History ==
The first wagons were cooled with ice that had been cut in winter from special pools or lakes. It was Gustavus Swift who succeed in the winter of 1877 for the first time in developing an efficient cooling system for railway wagons for Chicago businesses and meat producers. It circulated air through the ice and then through the entire wagon in order to cool it down. This system was the basis of the success of the Union Stock Yard, the Chicago slaughterhouses. The cooled wagons made it possible for the first time to transport the meat of slaughtered animals to the whole of the US. Later, manufactured ice was used, but this rapidly gave way to other means of cooling; the simplest was the substitution of normal (water) ice by dry ice. With the increasing reliability of combustion engines, engine-powered refrigerator vans emerged. There are even vans whose cooling is achieved by the evaporation of liquid gas.

== Construction ==
Compared with machine-cooled vans, ice-cooled wagons have the disadvantage of uneven temperature control, because the cooling effect is only achieved by air circulation. On the other hand, machine-cooled wagons are expensive to maintain and operate, but can be set to the desired temperature and maintained at that temperature throughout the entire journey. They are also better suited to transporting goods at deep-freeze temperatures of around −30 °C (−22 °F), whereas evaporators and ice-cooling are more suited to maintaining temperatures of around 0 °C (32 °F). Banana transport wagons with gas evaporators have an optimum internal temperature of +14.4 °C (57.9 °F) In addition to proper refrigerated vans, there are covered wagons with thermal insulation and, in some cases, even those are equipped with refrigerating sets. These wagons can only operate at temperatures between 0 and +20 °C (32 and 68 °F), where a constant internal temperature is desired.

In Asia, Chinese and Kazakh railways are experimenting with using refrigerated rail cars to transport sensitive consumer electronic goods manufactured in China to European markets. The products are transported in climate-controlled rail cars from factory towns in the interior of China to Almaty, Kazakhstan, and from there by air to Europe. The use of insulate climate-controlled cars makes it possible for these kinds of goods to be transported by rail even in winter, which had not been done previously.

== Use ==
In long-distance trains in the former Eastern Bloc countries, refrigerator trains were used that comprised a refrigeration plant wagon, a guards van and several refrigerated vans.

Most food is transported by road nowadays due to the shorter journey times. The stock of refrigerated vans owned by railway companies has therefore shrunk considerably. Most refrigerated vans in Europe today are operated by Interfrigo. These wagons are easy to tell apart externally: white vans are normal refrigerated wagons, blue ones with white stripes along the side are machine-cooled refrigerator vans.

== Types ==
Almost all refrigerated vans currently in service are built to UIC standard classes. The two-axled wagons have the same overall dimensions as the covered goods wagons of classes Gbs or Hbfs.

	UIC 571-3: Special classes			
Class	two-axle refrigerated vans		four-axle refrigerated vans	
Class	Standardwagen	Ferry wagons	1st Variant	2nd Variant
Class^{1)}	Ibbs / Ibbgs	Ibfs / Ibfgs	Ias / Iags	
Axle base	8.00 m		−	
Bogie pivot pitch	−		15.80 m	16.80 m
Length over buffers	14.02 m		21.04 m	22.24 m
Loading length, min.^{1)}	10.50 m / 11.00 m		16.40 m / 16.80 m	17.80 m / 18.00 m
Loading area, ca.^{1)}	27 m^{2} / 28 m^{2}	23 m^{2} / 24 m^{2}	42 m^{2} / 43 m^{2}	45 m^{2} / 46 m^{2}
Unladen weight, max.^{1)}	15,5 t / 18.5 t		31.0 t / 35.0 t	32.0 t / 36.0 t
Door height	1.90 m			
Door width	2,70 m			

1) Refrigerated and insulated vans / Refrigerated vans with cooling equipment

== See also ==
- Refrigerator car (covers US practice)
- Refrigerator van (covers UAE practice)
