= Wagon with opening roof =

Type of railway goods wagon

The wagon with opening roof is a type of railway goods wagon that is, nowadays, defined and standardised by the International Union of Railways (UIC) as Class "T". They are a large category of rail vehicle, predominantly used for the transport of hygroscopic bulk commodities such as cement, plaster, lime, potash and grain.

To date, there are four different types of wagon with an opening roof (by way of example, the years refer to when they entered service with the German carrier, DB):

- The lidded wagon with several "roof" hatches or lids that can be opened upwards is the oldest type and is rarely seen today. Its disadvantage was that the bars to which the lids were attached meant they could only be opened individually.
- In 1951 the sliding-roof wagon was built, whereby half the loading area could be opened up and loaded from above without obstruction at one time. This was achieved by sliding one half of the two-part roof over the other.
- In 1958 came the swing-roof wagon which enabled the entire loading area to be opened up by swinging the roof out on the longer side of the wagon. Its disadvantage is that, in some variants, the opened roof does not fit within the loading gauge and can thus block a neighbouring track.
- The latest development is the rolling roof wagon that entered service in 1973. Its plastic rolling roof can be completely rolled up at one end enabling the entire wagon to be loaded from above.

The overall design and use of these wagons is however governed far more by the configuration of their wagon floors and walls than the methods of loading and unloading. These features, which are also coded by index letters, form the basis of this article's structure.

== Wagons with opening roofs and level floors ==
=== Lidded wagons with level floors ===
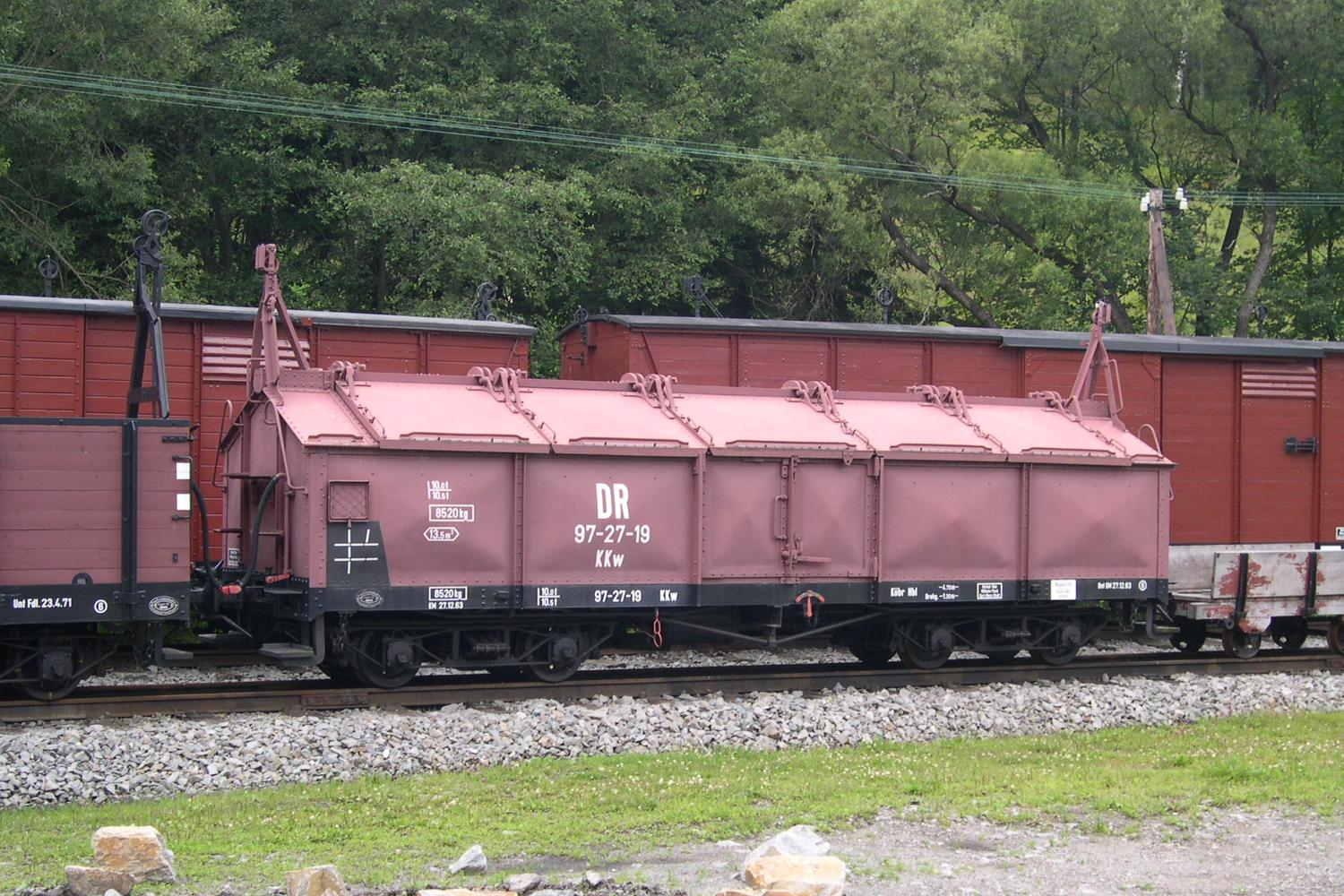
750 mm (2 ft 5 1/2 in) narrow-gauge lidded wagon of the Saxon narrow gauge railways

The classic lidded wagon for the transport of hygroscopic bulk goods was only procured by railway authorities in relatively small batches in comparison with other types of goods wagon. They were used on standard, as well as narrow gauge, railways (e.g. the Saxon narrow gauge railways). Their design was based closely on that of contemporary open wagons.

They were loaded from above and unloaded, like covered wagons, through the side doors. Because unloading involved a lot of manual work, alternatives were already being sought by the 1920s. In the 1950s the self-discharging wagon with roof (see below) completely ousted the lidded wagon from its original field of operations. The last large batch of lidded wagons was procured by the East German Deutsche Reichsbahn in 1958.

Standard gauge, lidded wagons may be viewed at a number of railway museums and, on several Saxon narrow gauge railways, lidded wagons can occasionally still be seen working at special goods train events.

=== Sliding-roof wagons and sliding-roof/sliding-side wagons ===
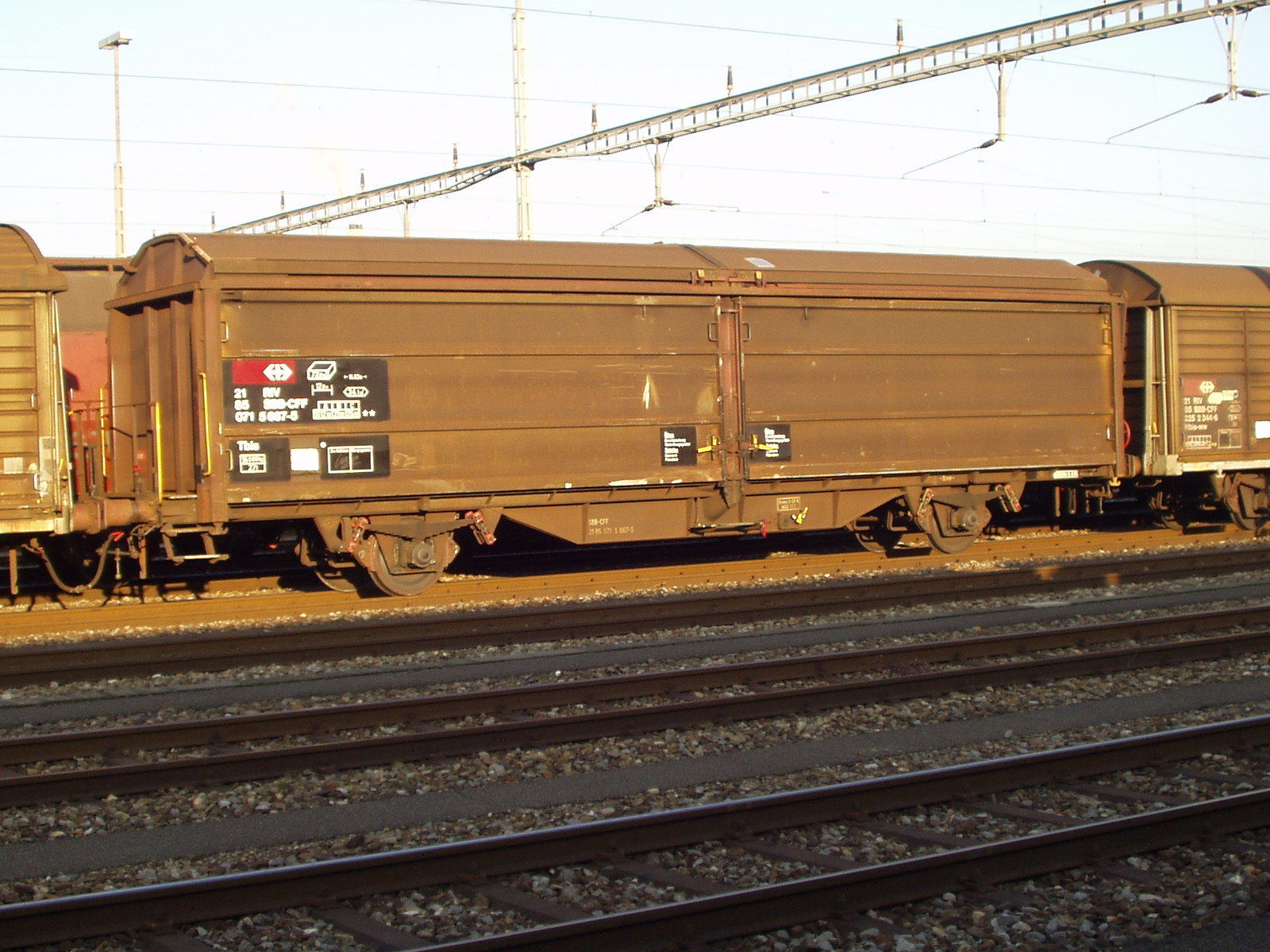
Covered goods wagon with sliding walls and opening roof : Class Tbis

Sliding-roof wagons were developed for the DB in the 1950s. From a design perspective they were initially just a development of the classic lidded wagon. However, they were no longer intended for bulk goods, but for awkward, moisture-sensitive part-load goods. The latter could be loaded and unloaded vertically by crane, the sliding roof enabling half the available length of the wagon floor to be available at one time.

Soon the small side doors were replaced by large, sliding sides (index letter i), in order to enable loading and unloading of palletised goods by forklift trucks. For example, the wagons could be loaded at a port directly from the ship by crane; at their destination they could then be unloaded through the side doors.

In the 1970s it became clear that the movable roof was only rarely used for palettised goods whilst, for larger, awkward loads, swing-roof wagons (see below) were better suited. As a result, the railways went over to a sliding-side wagon with a fixed roof; development of the sliding-side wagon being started in 1977.

=== Swing-roof and rolling roof wagons with level floors ===
For transporting heavier, even more awkward and moisture-sensitive goods the DB has, since 1964, four-axled wagons with movable roofs. To begin with these were swing-roofs that were divided in two along their longitudinal axis and folded out to the sides. In order to avoid breaching the loading gauge when the roof was opened, these were abandoned in favour of rolling roofs.

In terms of design, these wagons are closely related to the four-axled standard open wagon. For example, even the major dimensions of the UIC-standardized rolling roof wagon matches its open wagon counterpart, the Class Ea(o)s:

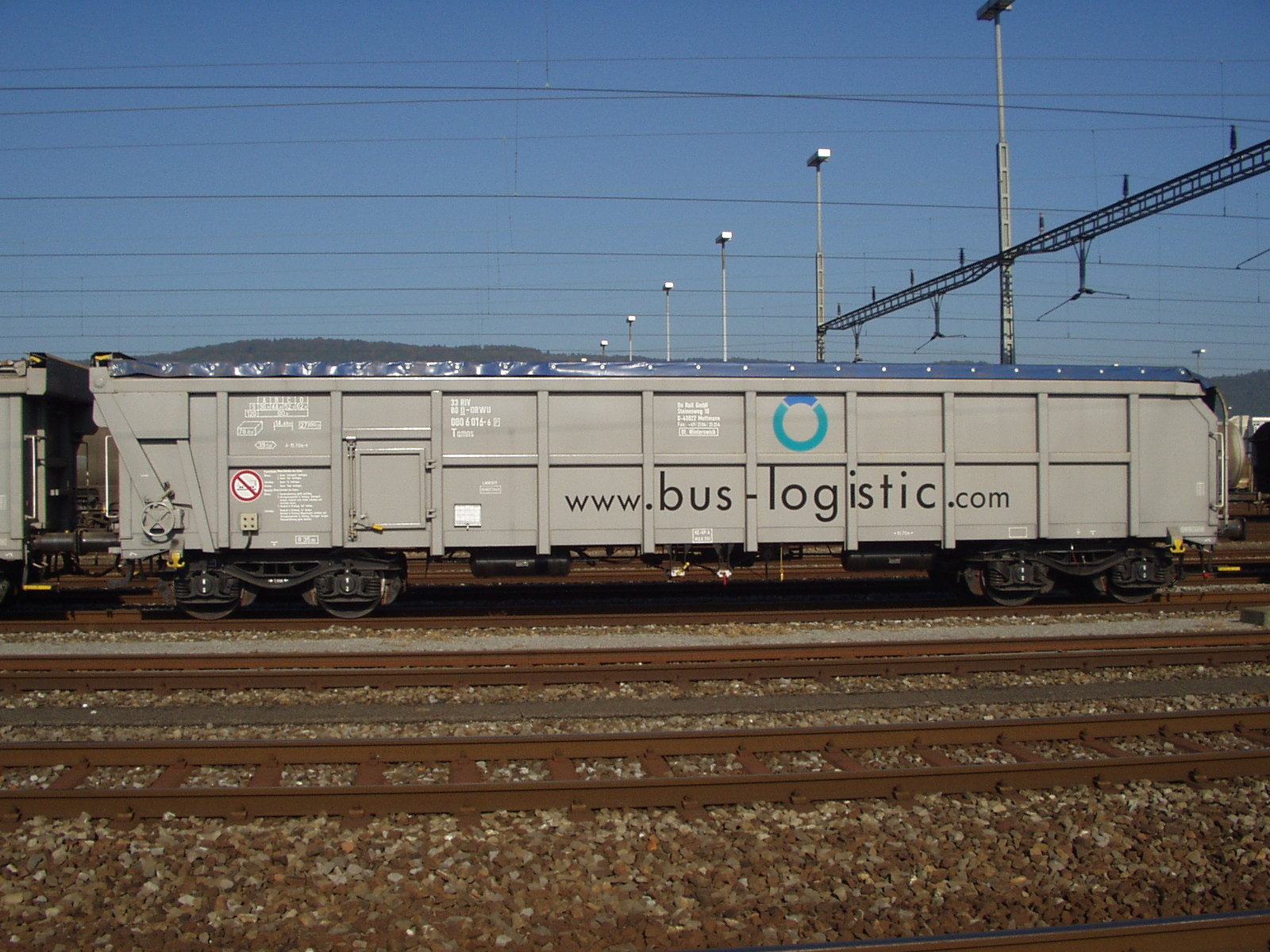
Rolling roof wagon of class Tamns

Norm	UIC 571-3: Special type
Type	Four-axled rolling roof wagon
UIC designation	Taems to 1979: Taes
Pivot pitch	9.00 m (29 ft 6 3/8 in)
Length over buffers	14.04 m (46 ft 3/4 in)
Loading length, min.	12.40 m (40 ft 8 1/4 in)
Loading areae, approx.	33 m^{2} (360 sq ft)
Loading volume, approx.	74 m^{3} (2,600 cu ft)
Unladen weight, max.	24.0 t (23.6 long tons; 26.5 short tons)
Doors per side	1
Door width	4.00 m (13 ft 1 1/2 in)

The swing-roof and rolling-roof wagons with level floors feature a high loading limit of at least 50 t and are therefore often used in heavy industry. In addition, they are good for hygroscopic bulk commodities which have to be loaded from above. This type of wagon shares its sphere of operations with flat wagons with tarpaulins or hoods in classes K, R and S.

== Goods wagons with opening roof and gravity discharge ==
In order to rationalize the loading and unloading of bulk goods, the Deutsche Reichsbahn, before the Second World War, had Self-discharging wagons with lids (Selbstentladewagen mit Klappdeckeln) built. They were designed as saddle wagons which enabled rapid gravity discharge.

Since 1958, the Self-discharging wagon with swing-roof has been employed in large numbers in Europe. In the transport of hygroscopic bulk commodities, they have fully replaced both the wagon with opening roof and level floor (see above) as well as the standard covered wagon.

Most of these wagons enable high-level side discharge and, like the open wagons with gravity discharge, there are two basic types:

- Hopper wagons: Wagons with funnel-shaped floors and controllable gravity unloading (Class T…d…)
- Saddle-bottomed wagons: Wagons with saddle-shaped floors and bulk gravity unloading (today, Class T…l…, until 1979 T…d…)

Even the main dimensions of the two UIC standard wagons are identical with those of the open goods wagons (Fcs and Fals):

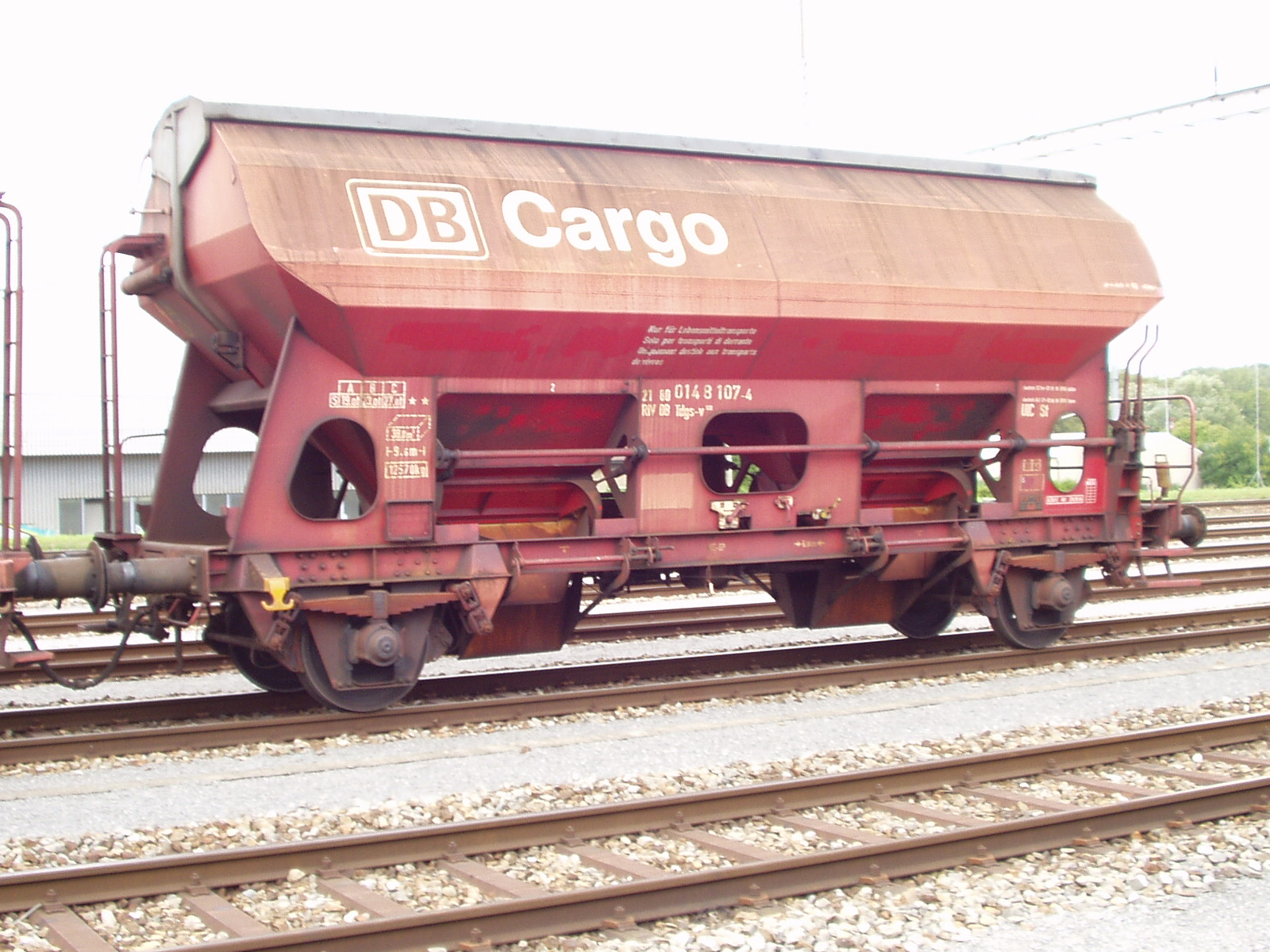
Tdgs: UIC standard wagon with opening roof and controllable, side, gravity discharge for the transport of foodstuffs (sugar)

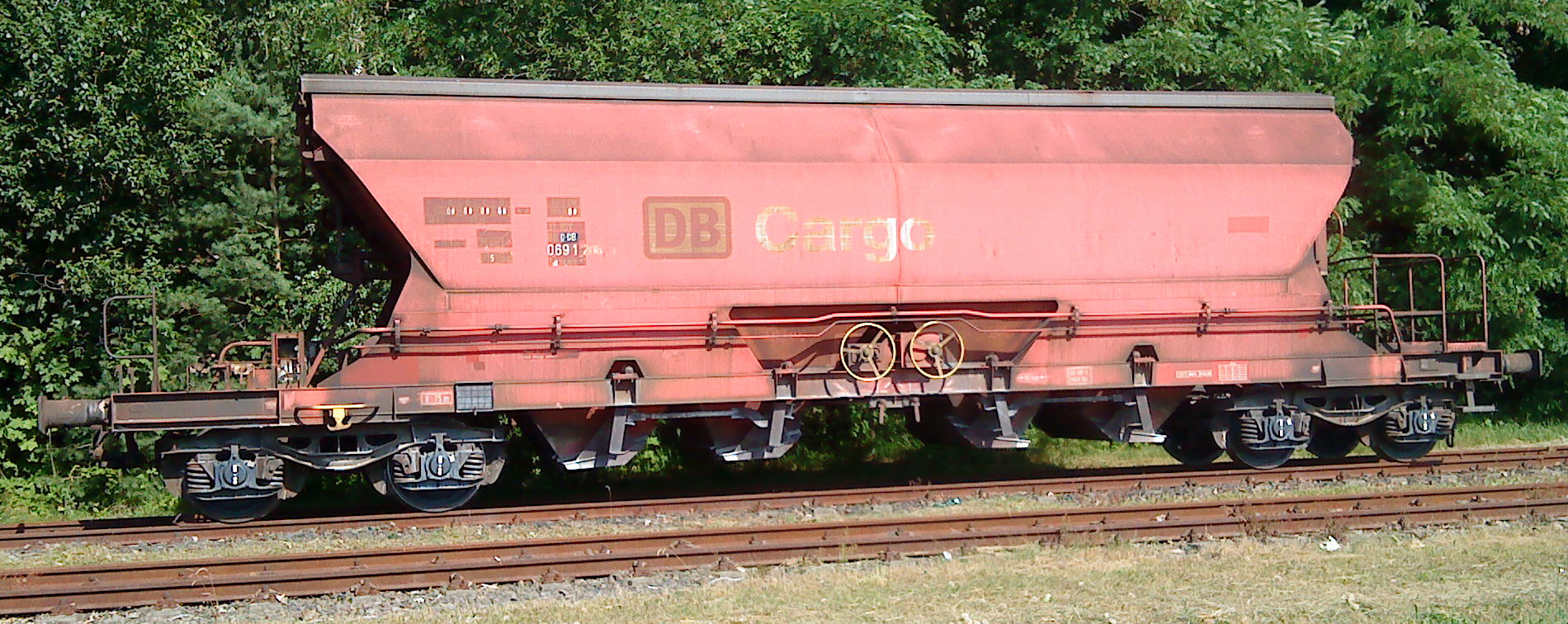
Tanoos^{896}: Wagon with opening roof and apertures above the centre of the track for bulk gravity discharge at the Caminau kaolin factory

Norm	UIC 571-3: Special type	
Type	Two-axle hopper wagon with swing-roof	Four-axle saddle-bottomed wagon with swing-roof
UIC Class	Tds	Tals
Axle base	6.00 m (19 ft 8 1/4 in)	−
Pivot pitch	−	7.50 m (24 ft 7 1/4 in)
Length over buffers	964 m (3,162 ft 8 3/4 in)	12.54 m (41 ft 1 3/4 in)
Loading volume, approx.	38 m^{3} (1,300 cu ft)	72 m^{3} (2,500 cu ft)
Unladen weight, max.	13.5 t (13.3 long tons; 14.9 short tons)	15.5 t (15.3 long tons; 17.1 short tons)

The wagons are normally reserved for one type of commodity in order to avoid having to clean them after use, but also because certain goods require the loading space to be lined in order to avoid them sticking to the walls or, with chemicals, to protect the walls from corrosion. Many Td wagons are exclusively used for the transport of foodstuffs and therefore bear the index letter g.

In addition there are special types for specific purposes, for example those with low-level apertures for gravity discharging (Class T…oo…).

The distinction with UIC Class U wagons is fluid. Especially when wagons do not conform to the UIC standard wagon or only have a roof hatch for loading instead of a movable roof, they count as special wagons. Many French grain wagons therefore have a 9 instead of a 0 in their wagon numbers.

== See also ==
- Coil car
- Covered hopper
- Hopper car

== Literature ==
- Carstens S: Die Güterwagen der DB AG, MIBA-Verlag, Nuremberg, 1998.
- Carstens S et al.: Güterwagen (Vol, 2), MIBA-Verlag, Nuremberg, 2000.
- Carstens S et al.: Güterwagen (Vol. 4), MIBA-Verlag, Nuremberg, 2003.
