= German State Railway Wagon Association =

The German State Railway Wagon Association (German: Deutscher Staatsbahnwagenverband) or DWV was an association of the German state railways Länderbahnen founded in 1909. The purpose of the association was to guarantee the unrestricted exchange of goods wagons between the member railway administrations. The German State Railway Wagon Association could, unlike the Prussian State Railway Wagon Association, stipulate standard wagon designs for the whole of Germany. It developed a total of eleven different wagon types, the Verbandsbauart (literally: association type) or DWV wagons. In addition to entire goods wagons, types of bogie were also specified.

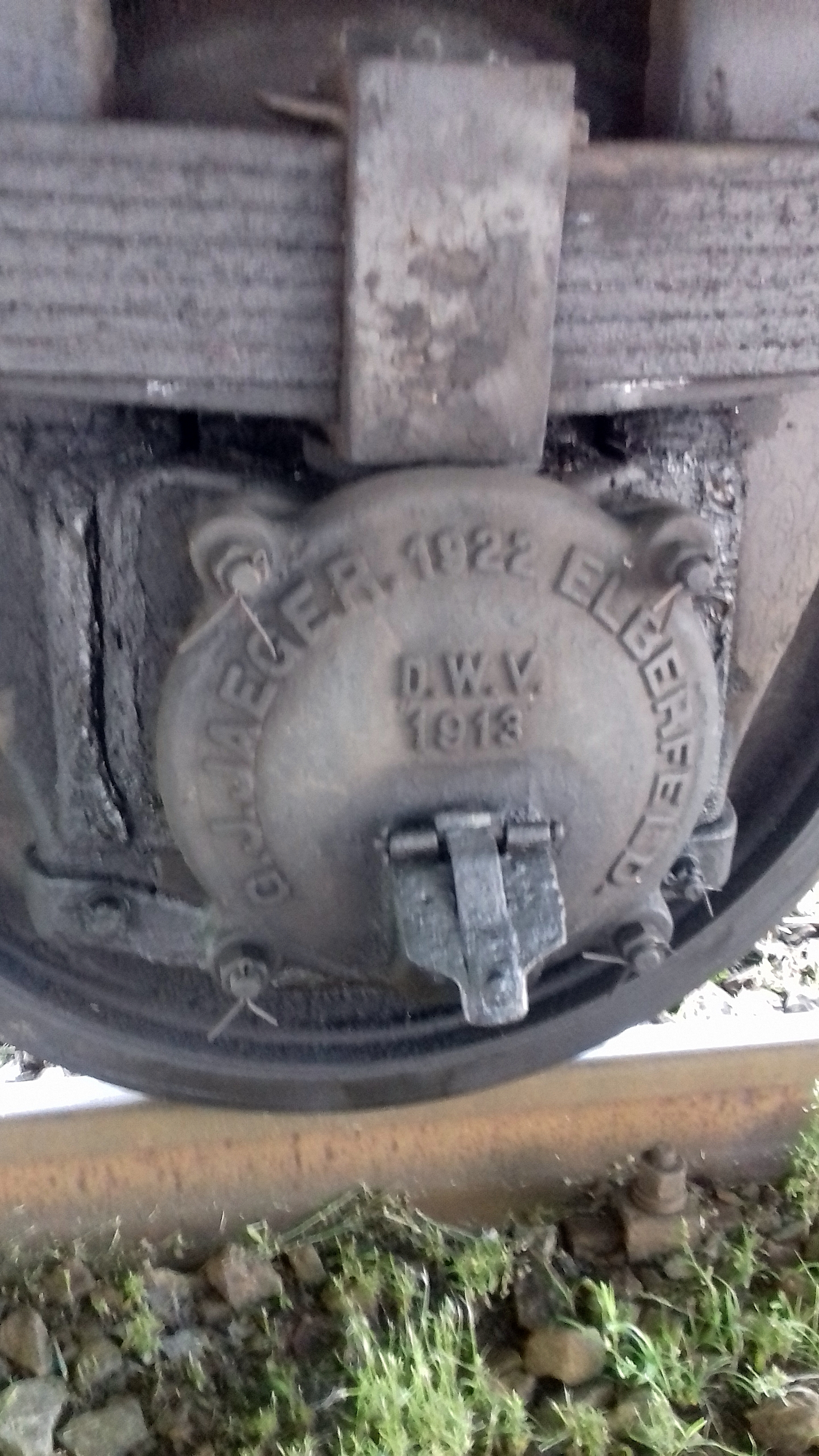
Axle bearing housing of a railway wagon from 1922. Inscription: D.W.V. 1913

== End ==
With the founding of the Deutsche Reichsbahn on 1 April 1920 the DWV closed its operations.

== See also ==
- History of rail transport in Germany
