= Well wagon =

Well wagon may refer to

- intermodal container well wagon including ones that carry semi-trailers
- Kangourou wagon
- Pocket wagon
- Well car
- Pre containerization well wagons (pocket wagons)
- Special low deck wagons

== See also ==
- Lowmac
- Tiphook
- Heavy capacity flatcars
