= Tiphook =

Transport services company

Tiphook PLC
- Type: Public limited company
- Industry: Transport
- Founded: 1975
- Defunct: 1997
- Fate: Divested
- Successor: TIP Trailer Services, Cargowaggon
- Headquarters: London, England
- Key people: Robert Montague

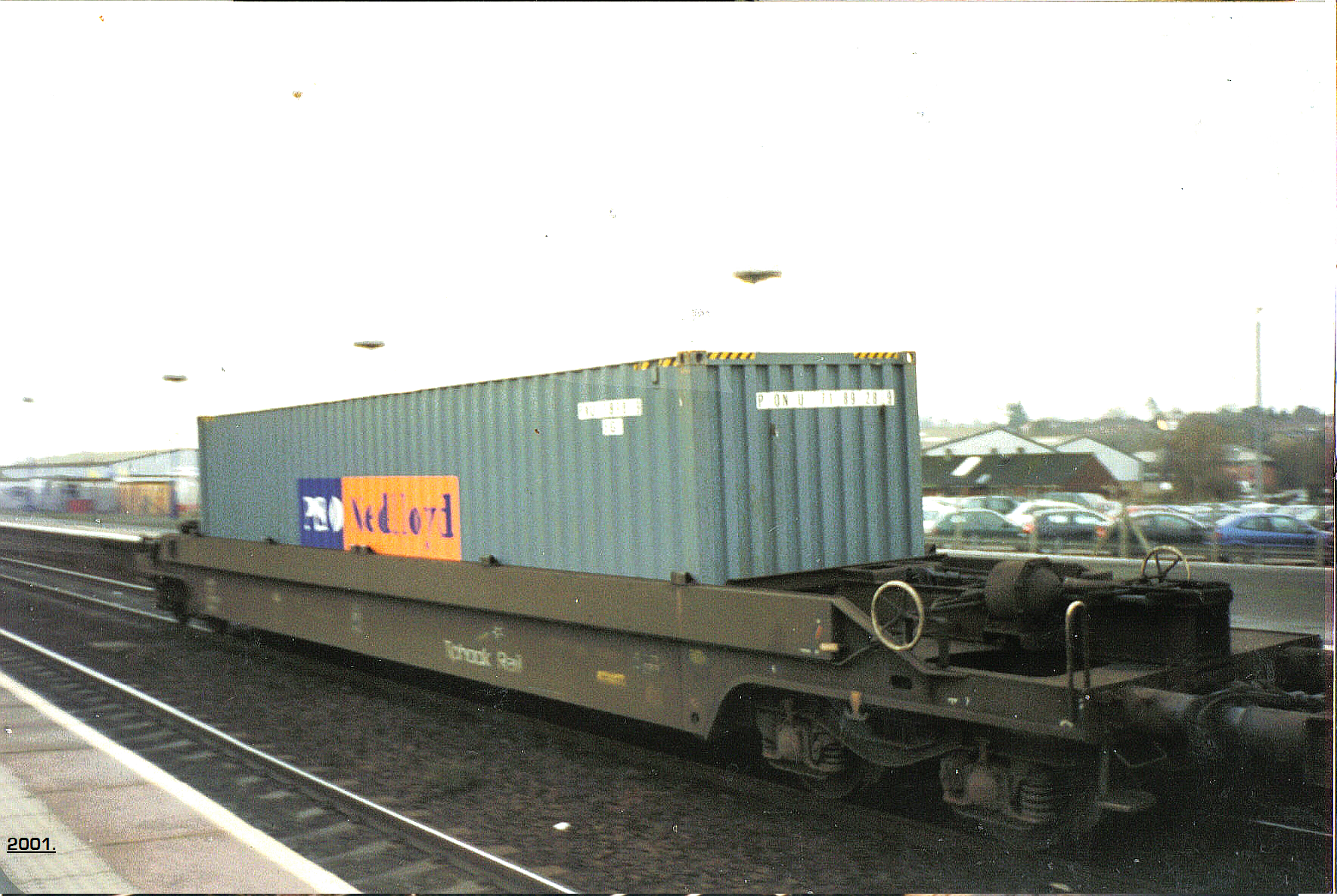
A Tiphook rail intermodal freight well wagon at Banbury station in Banbury, United Kingdom in 2001

Tiphook PLC was a United Kingdom headquartered transport services company that was registered on both the London and New York stock markets. It was once a constituent of the FTSE 100 Index and became the world's second-largest marine container leasing business in the 1990s.

Tiphook was established by Robert Montague in 1975 with the goal of capitalising on the transition towards ISO-based intermodal containerised based logistics. It focused on the leasing of containers and trailers to serve this expanding sector and quickly proved to be quite lucrative, and thus the company entered into the provision of other services, such as maintenance, as well as growing internationally. Throughout the 1980s, Tiphook frequently acquired various other companies, issuing shares and took on debts in order to rapidly expand, yet the value of some of these acquisitions was subsequently called into question. While the company continued to be profitable into the early 1990s, it had built up a substantial debt burden that was leveraged upon its assets, the value of which dropped considerably as more containers became available on the market.

In the early 1990s, Tiphook's financial situation sharply declined as its assets depreciated sharply and questions over its accounting practices were raised by creditors; its expansion into the North American market had US accounting practices applicable, under which the condition of the company led to a technical, and then actual, default in its debt coverage. As a result, the company underwent drastic restructuring, Montague and many senior figures were pushed out, and Tiphook was broken up to pay off its debts during the mid-1990s. The rail leasing arm of the business was spun out in 1996 and briefly traded under the name International Wagon Services before being acquired by General Electric (GE) and integrated into its European rail leasing business.

== Early years ==
The origins of Tiphook are closely associated with its founder, Robert Montague. Prior to creating the business in 1975, Montague had worked at the multinational fuel conglomerate Esso and managed his father's transport business.

Tiphook took advantage of a major shift in global transport practices, under which the traditional model of moving loose cargoes was being replaced by the use of ISO-based intermodal containerised based transportation systems. This transition resulted in customers and transport companies requiring more flexible business solutions, resulting in Tiphook having two basic service offerings, these being the supply of leased ISO containers, and of leased trailers (both road and railway) The company supplemented this initial model with value-added services including maintenance and trans-border clearance. Tiphook expressed an interest in entering various business sectors, including the operation of Britain's railways.

Throughout the 1980s, Tiphook sought to expand rapidly via multiple acquisitions. It frequently issued shares to raise funding for purchasing other companies, and often took on their existing debts. Some of these acquisitions, such as that of that Barclays Bank-owned Trailerent Ltd in 1989, referred to the Competition Commission.

Perhaps the biggest takeover bid made by the firm was launched in May 1989, when Tiphook attempted a $824 million bid of rival logistics company Sea Containers, which was vigorously opposed by its founder James Sherwood. Amid the process, Tiphook's management alleged that Sherwood had an authoritarian management style, while Sherwood issued his own allegations of irregularities in filings with the Securities and Exchange Commission. Sea Containers' Shareholders ultimately backed Sherwood's position, which had proposed asset sales and a restructuring to win favour, leading to Tiphook's acquisition ultimately failing.

As a consequence of its expansive strategy, Tiphook accumulated relatively high levels of debt, which were assured to lenders through assets on the business's balance sheet. During the early 1990s, concerns were raised by these lenders over the potential overvaluation of some of these acquisitions. Despite these concerns, as late as 1991, Tiphook was widely regarded as a successful and highly profitable business. The company had intentionally structured its growth to avoid becoming overly dependent upon any single country or customer, an approach which supposedly also limited its exposure to recessionary pressure.

== Difficulties and collapse ==
Tiphook owned the majority of its assets, which were mainly containers and road trailers. As the popularity of containers increased, their cost of manufacture dropped to around $2,000 per 40 ft ISO unit. This cost was below the asset value logged on Tiphook's book, which resulted in a technical default in Tiphook's loans under US Accountancy laws. Shortly after this was recognised, a class action by US-based shareholders was proposed, as the published accounts were now in doubt. Independent accountants were commissioned by the banks who had lent money to Tiphook studied the company's books in-depth. Tiphook's practices regarding depreciation, while compliant with UK law at that time, was subject to criticism. Furthermore, the company had committed to £327 million of capital expenditure on new trailers through to 1998, a considerable expense on top of Tiphook's various outstanding commitments. In response, Roger Braidwood, Tiphook's finance director, resigned from his position.

Further negative publicity for the company came in the form of revelations about Montague himself, who was one of the highest-paid executives in Britain at that time, having been paid a salary of £851,000 in 1992. Actions taken by Montague, such as his purchasing of company shares using loans from the company itself, and luxurious lifestyle, such as 24-hour access to both a chauffeur-driven Bentley and a Hawker Siddeley HS124 corporate jet, also led to criticism. By late 1993, Tiphook and its directors, which included Charles Powell, had come under severe shareholder pressure.

The company resultantly agreed to reduce its debts by selling off its profitable containers business, eventually agreeing terms with Transamerica Corporation in exchange for £700 million in February 1994, although this was £77 million less than had originally been agreed. That same month, Tiphook announced that it had incurred interim pre-tax losses of £180 million, accompanied by numerous write-downs and provisions. The company's performance is being hindered by wider economic factors, including an economic recession, that had led to a downturn in demand for its leasing services. In April 1994, it was announced that Tiphook would be delisted from its secondary listing on the Hong Kong Stock Exchange.

In June 1994, Tiphook appointed former BOC finance director Ian Clubb as its new chairman with the primary priority of stabilising the business. Several changes were quickly enacted, numerous executives departed the company including Montague, who was compelled to resign in December 1994; there were numerous complaints of allegedly excessive levels of remuneration paid to senior figures at this time. Furthermore, the business was rebranded as Central Transport Rental plc. Amongst other consequences, these changes resolved the class action.

== Aftermath ==
In May 1996, Tiphook Rail was sold in a management buyout and renamed International Wagon Services Ltd. During 1998, it was purchased by GE Equipment Services to form part of its pan-European rail services business Cargowaggon.

The residual company was branded as Tiphook Trailers. By 1997, this entity operated a fleet of 22,500 trailers at 132 depots in nine European countries. In July 1997, it was sold in 1997 to GE Capital, who merged it with its existing TIP Trailer Services rental and leasing company.

Shortly following his departure from Tiphook, Montague was declared bankrupt in 1994, having accumulated personal debts of £30 million. After release from his legal obligations, he started pan-European transport equipment leasing company Axis Intermodal in 1995. Montague promoted the venture's business model as being fundamentally different to Tiphook's, such as by not owning any of its containers and being more risk-averse. During 2004, this business was folded into Intermodal Resources, which was subsequently listed on the Alternative Investment Market (AIM). By 2009, the company had adopted the Sea-Axis brand.

In light of the collapse of Tiphook, along with other events such as the Robert Maxwell scandal at the Daily Mirror, the British Government responded with new legislation that pertained to corporate governance practices.

== See also ==
- Kangourou wagon
- Pocket wagon
- Well car
- Well wagon
