= Trailer-on-flatcar =

Practice of carrying truck semi-trailers on railroad freight cars

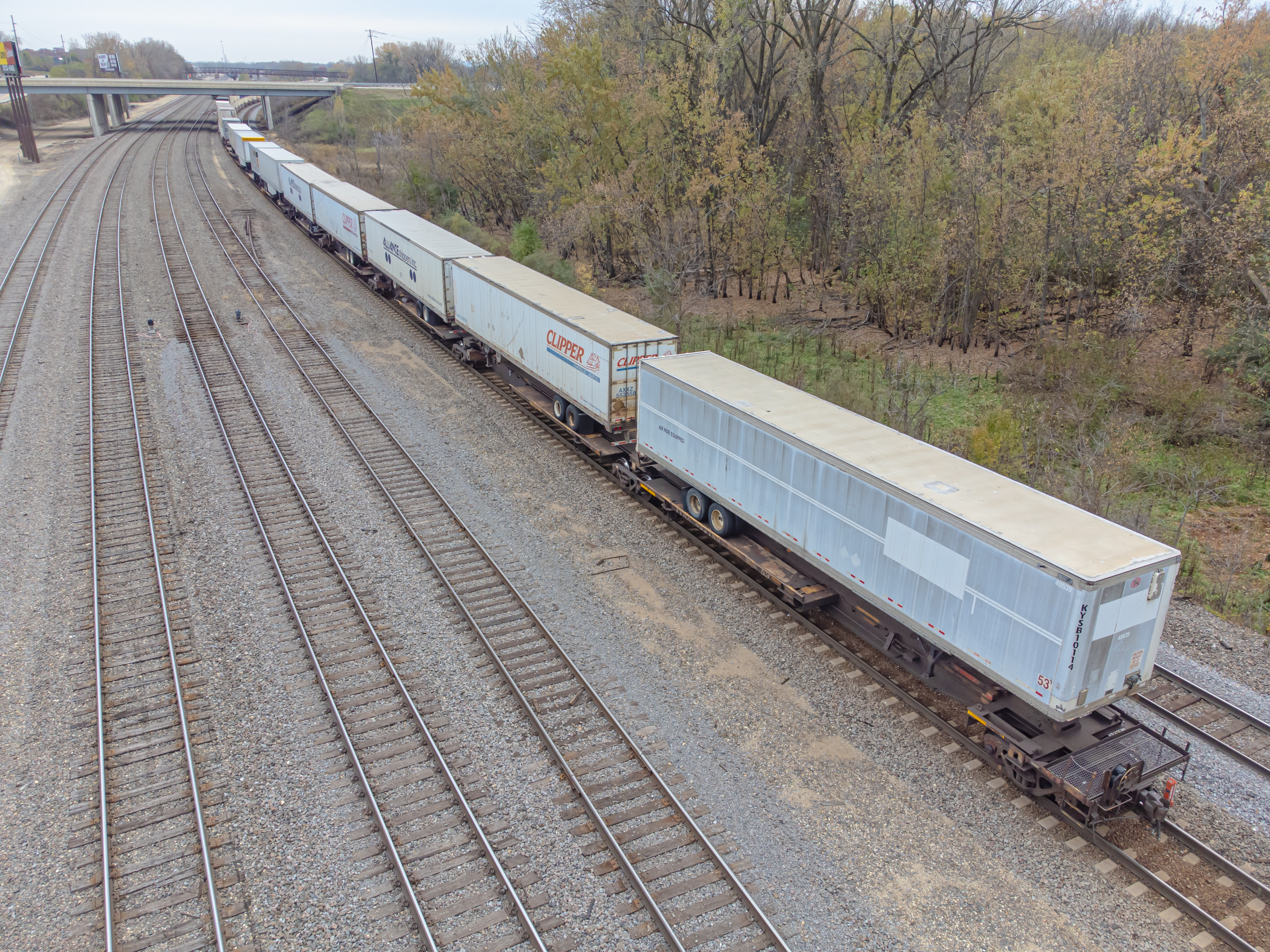
Spine cars with semi trailers on them

Trailer-on-flatcar, also known as TOFC or piggyback, is the practice of carrying semi-trailers on railroad flatcars. TOFC allows for shippers to move truckloads long distances more cheaply than can be done by having each trailer towed by a truck, since one train can carry more than 100 trailers at once. The trailers will be moved by truck from their origin to an intermodal facility, where they will then be loaded onto a train, typically by a rubber tired gantry crane, for the bulk of their journey. Alternatively, trailers may be driven onto the flatcars via ramps by a terminal tractor. Near the destination, the trailers are unloaded at another facility and brought to their final destination by a tractor unit.

Modern TOFC service was introduced in North America in the 1950s, although the practice of carrying another mode of transport on flatcars was first recorded in 1843 when canal boats were moved by a portage railway between several cities in Pennsylvania.

TOFC is distinct from containerization. While both are examples of intermodal transport, trailer on flatcar is the loading of entire trailers onto railroad cars, while in containerization, the container is detached from the trailer chassis for railroad transport.

== Gallery ==
Trailers on flatcar

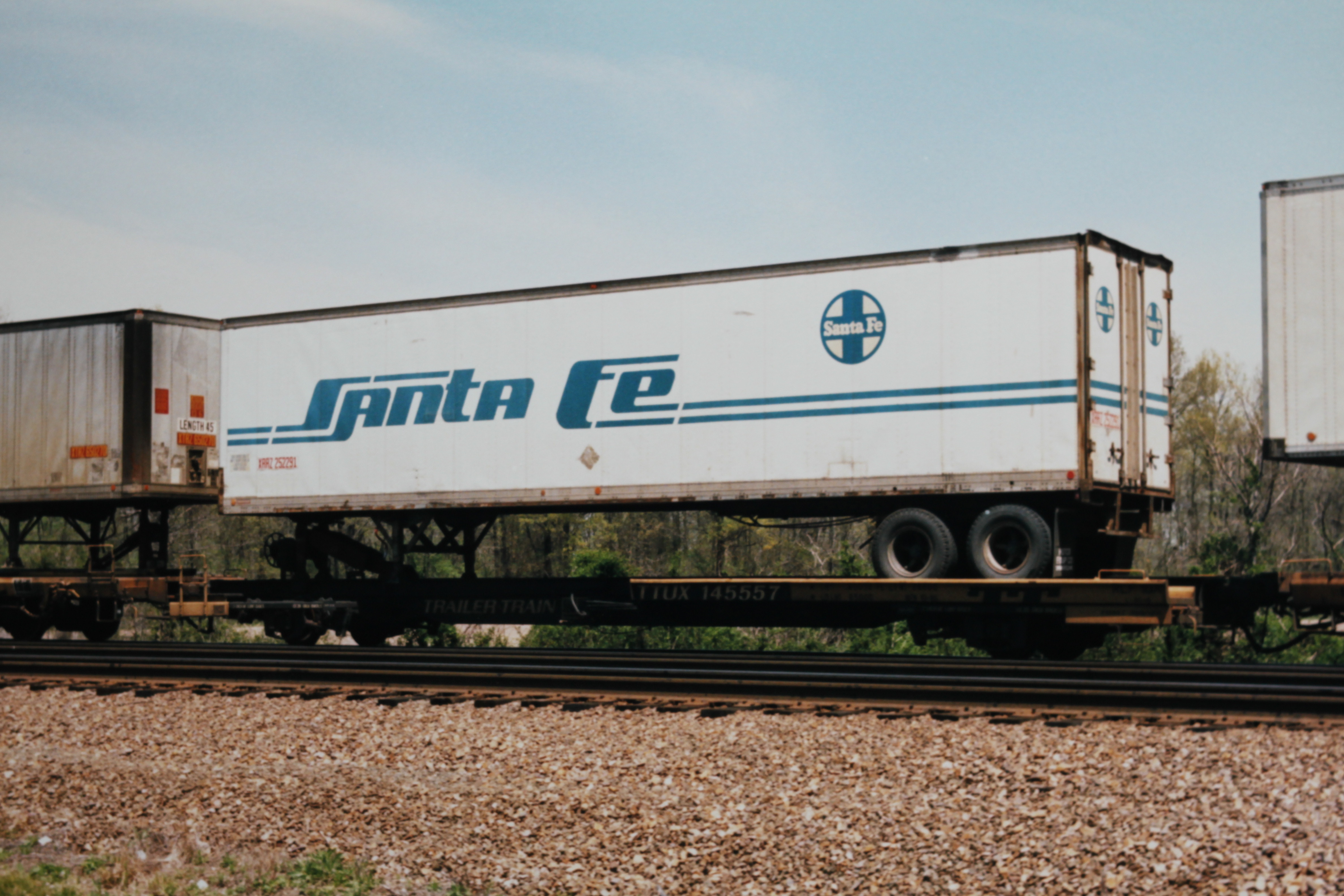
A Santa Fe semi-trailer carried on a flatcar as part of a TOFC train.

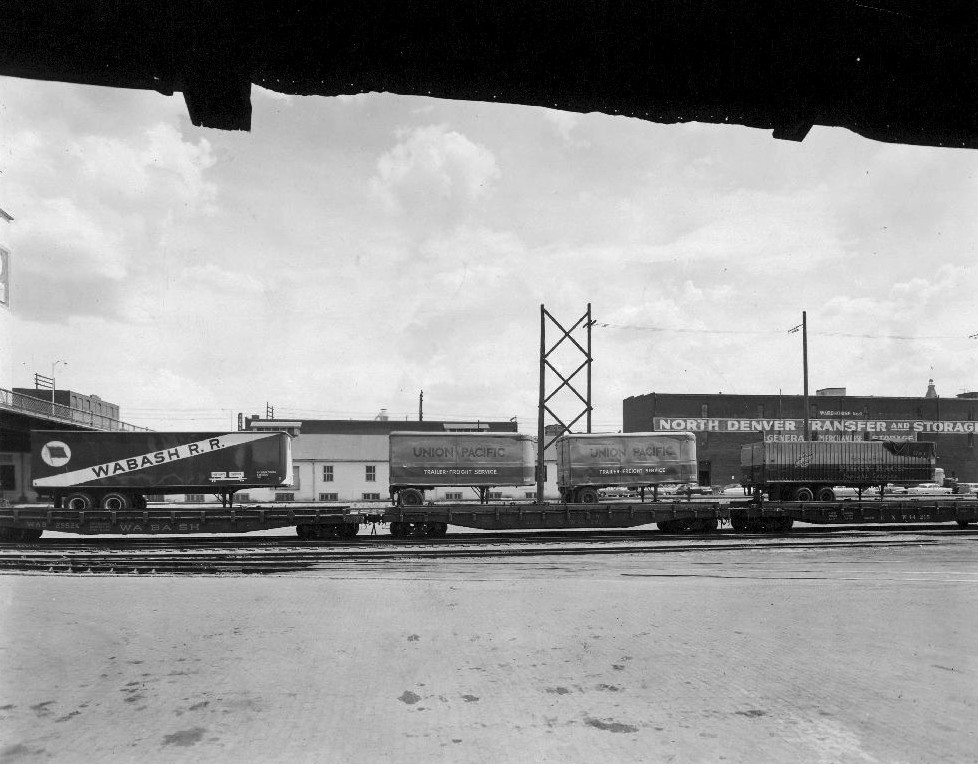
Semi-trailer on flatcar service run by the Union Pacific Railroad in 1955

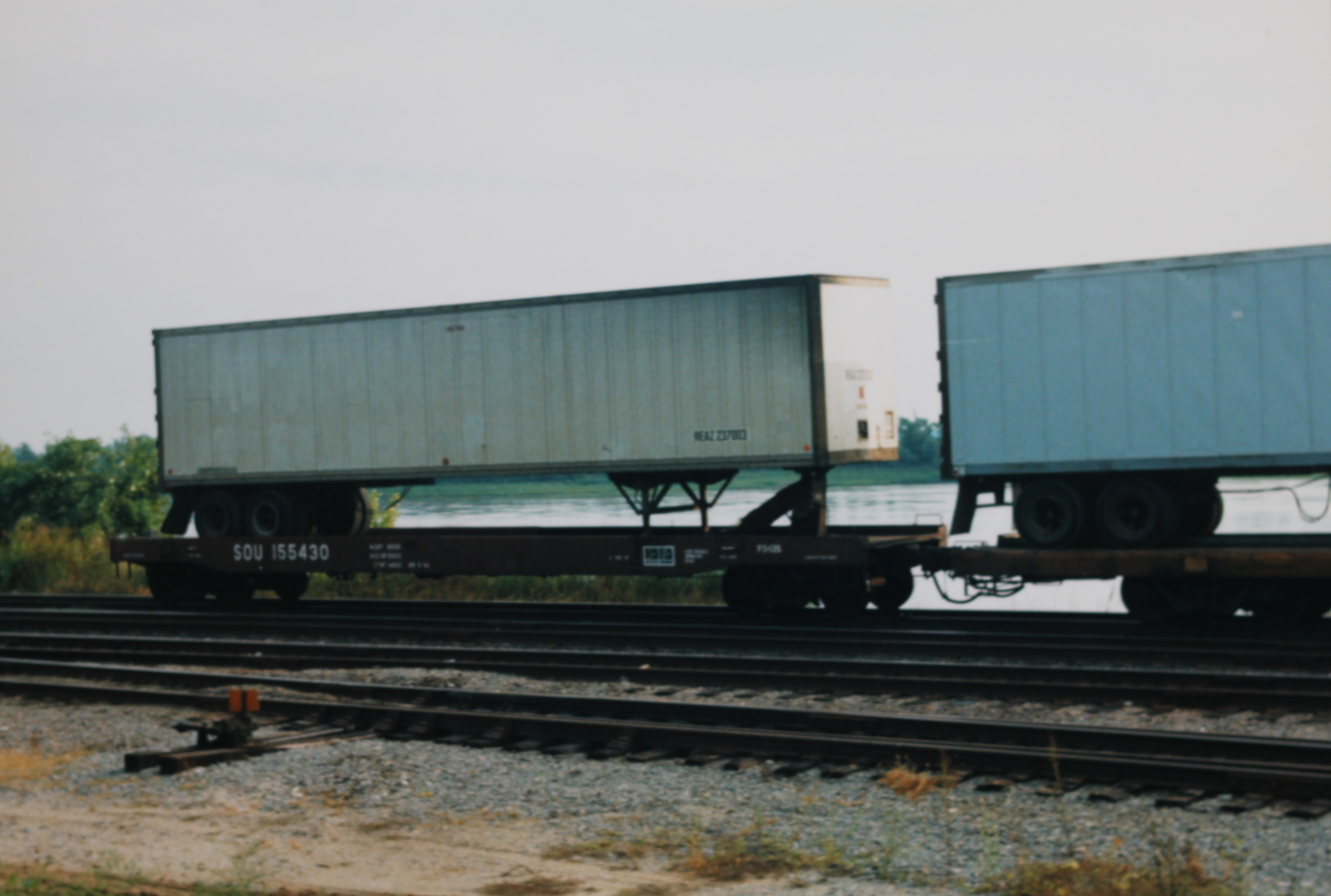
A semi-trailer on a flatcar of the Southern Railway

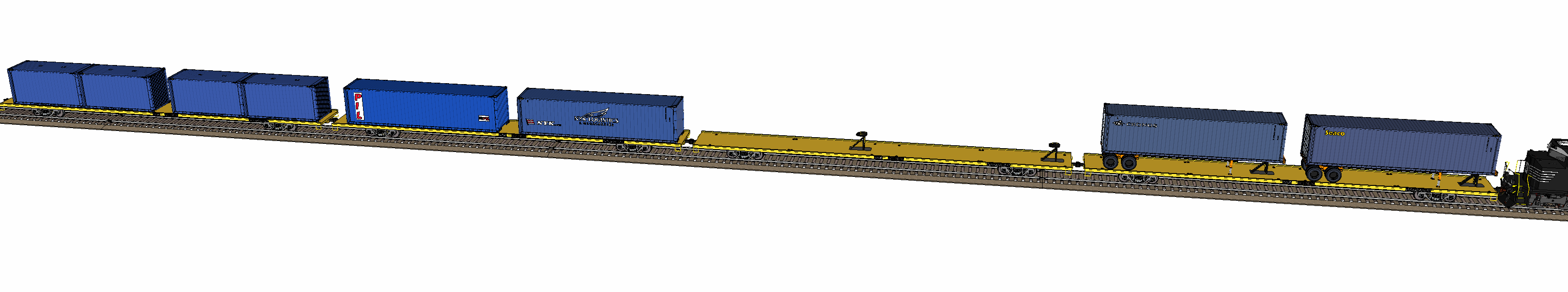
Four 89-foot (27.13 m) long intermodal flatcars

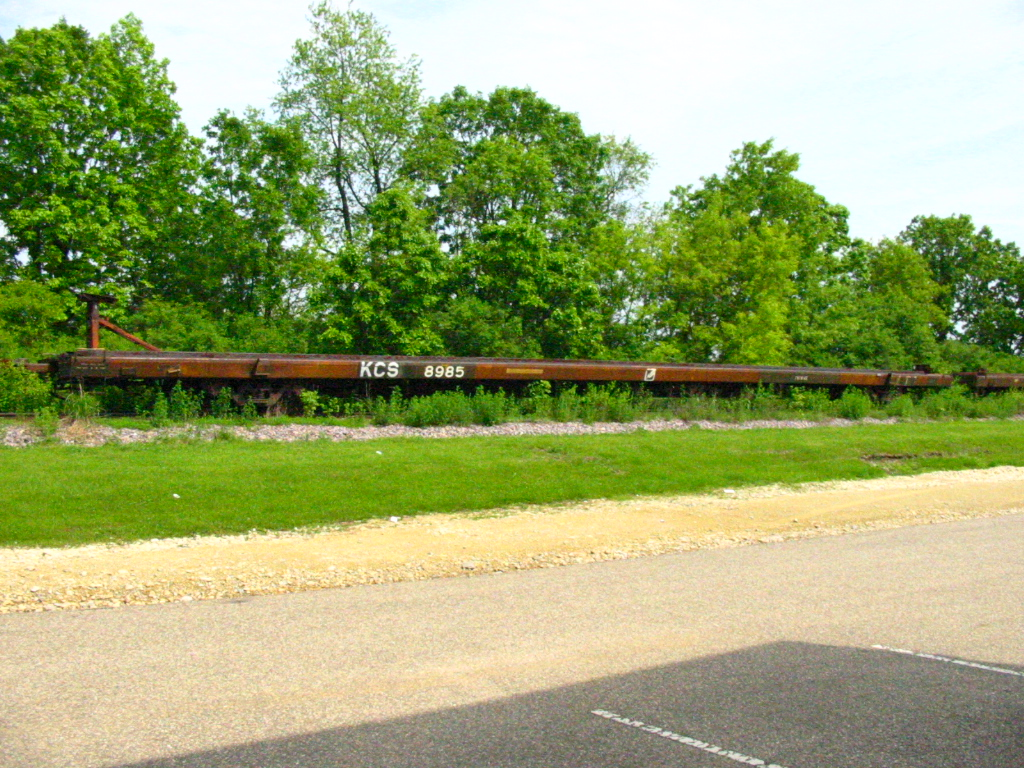
This Kansas City Southern Railway flatcar is fitted with fifth wheel couplings for hauling trailers. (2004)

== Infrastructure requirements ==
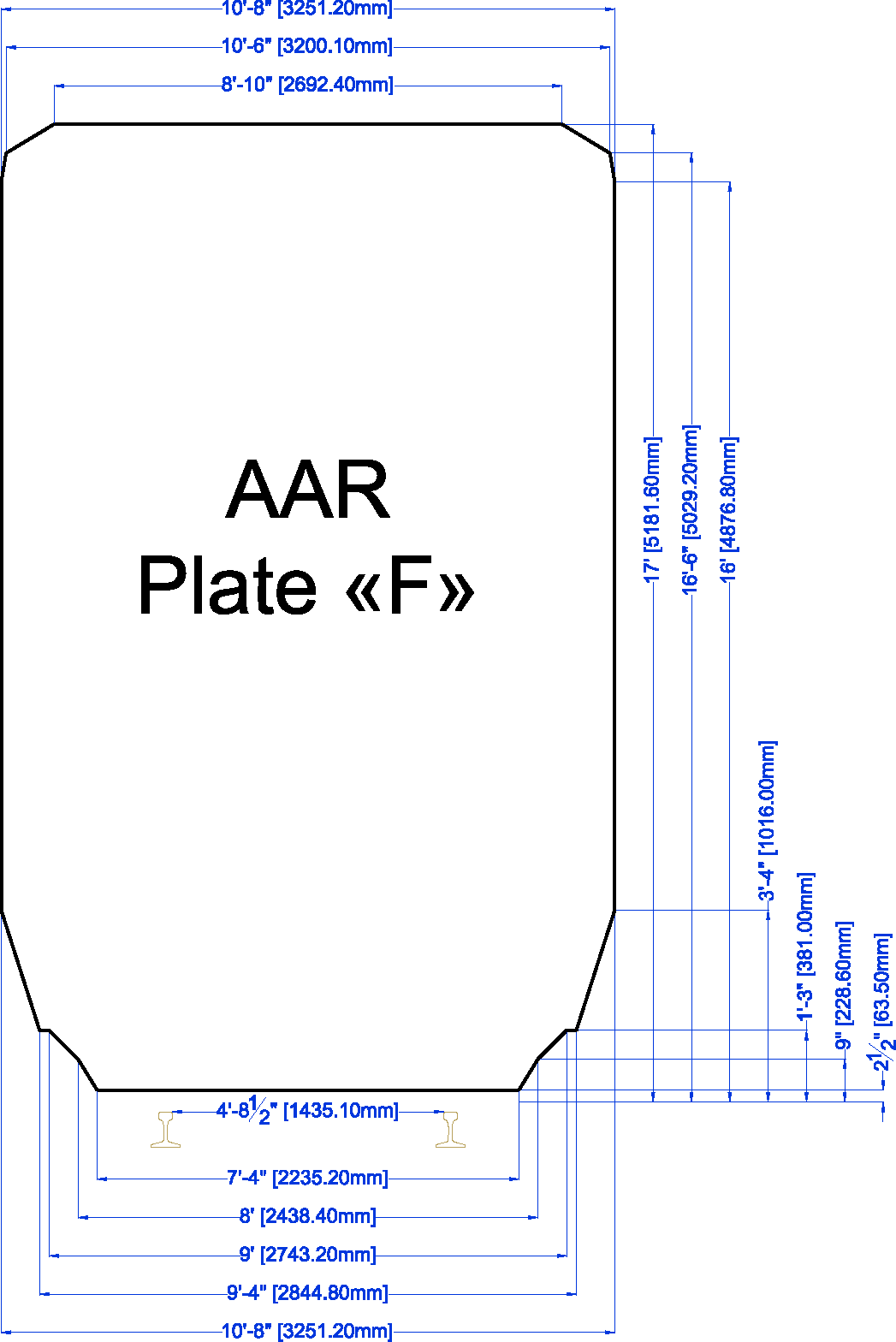
Adequate AAR loading gauge for TOFC

Besides the need for facilities to handle loading and unloading with road (preferably highway) access, trailer on flatcar operations impose certain height clearance requirements. In North America, including Mexico, this is mostly a non-issue as double-stack rail transport imposes much more demanding clearance requirements, but regions with more constrained loading gauges may impose limits on this type of transport or make it impossible altogether. However, height clearance requirements tend to be slightly lower than for rolling highway transportation where entire trucks are loaded onto rail vehicles. The trailers themselves also need to meet certain minimum requirements to be able to be moved via crane, which is the most cost- and time-efficient way of loading and unloading them onto the train. To allow trailer on flatcar transport involving maximum height trailers, Switzerland is upgrading existing lines feeding into the "Gotthard Axis" of the New Railway Link through the Alps to a so-called "4-m corridor" named for the 4 meters (13 ft) maximum height of the trailers as specified in road transport regulations. As upgrading the loading gauge of an existing railway can be very expensive, especially when tunnels and bridges follow in close succession like on the right Pegnitz Valley line, increasingly newly built lines are built to the most generous standards deemed feasible, even if the need for such generous clearances seems remote at the time of construction. For example, the Betuweroute in the Netherlands an important freight link from the Dutch seaports to the Blue Banana had all bridges and tunnels built to standards allowing double stack rail transport in the future by simply raising the overhead wire.

== See also ==
- Kangourou wagon
- Modalohr
- Pocket wagon
- Rolling highway - a similar practice, but transporting complete semi-trailer trucks.
- Roadrailer
