= GE Equipment Services =

GE Equipment Services was a Stamford, Connecticut-based division of General Electric Industrial, providing transport solutions for supply chains, including equipment leasing, asset management, and logistics services.

The European headquarters of GE Equipment Services was located in Amsterdam, Netherlands.

Divisions of GE Equipment Services included GE Rail Services Europe, Penske Truck Leasing, and General Electric Railcar Services Corp.

The European division of GE Equipment Services was sold in October 2013 to HNA Group, China and operates as TIP Trailer Services.
