= Class U special wagon =

The International Union of Railways groups all special classes of railway goods wagon (less those in classes F, H, L, S or Z) into Class U in its goods wagon classification system.

These are:

- Bulk goods wagons for transporting powders, etc.
- Dual coupling wagons for joining wagons with different coupling systems
- Barrier vehicles for joining wagons with different coupling systems
- Well wagons, including low-deck wagons and Schnabel wagons
- Self-discharging hoppers with loading hatches
- Trials vehicles for RoadRailer and Kombirail systems for intermodal transport.

Between 1964 and 1979 bulk goods wagons for liquid and gaseous materials (tank wagons) were included in Class U before being reclassified in 1980 as Class Z.

== Bulk goods wagons for transporting powders (powder wagons) ==
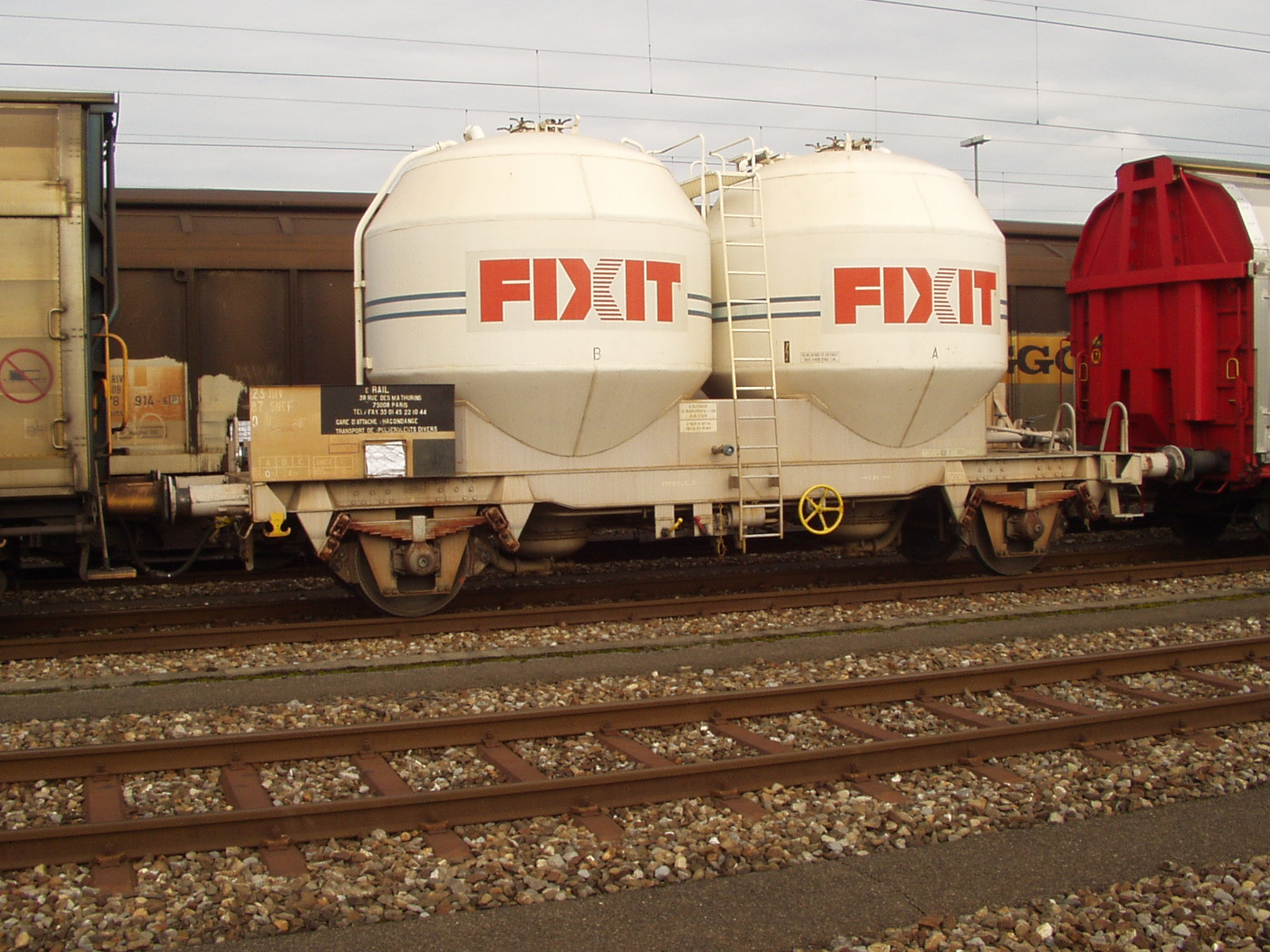
Two-axled powder wagon for building materials (cement, lime)

The powder wagon is a special form of bulk goods wagon designed to transport goods in powder form. These wagons are pneumatically unloaded, usually by using compressed air. For goods that might react with oxygen in the compressed air, nitrogen is used instead. These wagons are used for bulk commodities, such as cement, that are so fine-grained they cannot be poured, or at least do not pour very well, and so cannot be emptied under gravity. Under the UIC system they are given the category letter U and index letter c. They do not normally have their own compressors but must be unloaded using external equipment.

== Intermodal container open wagons ==
Four-axle container well wagons

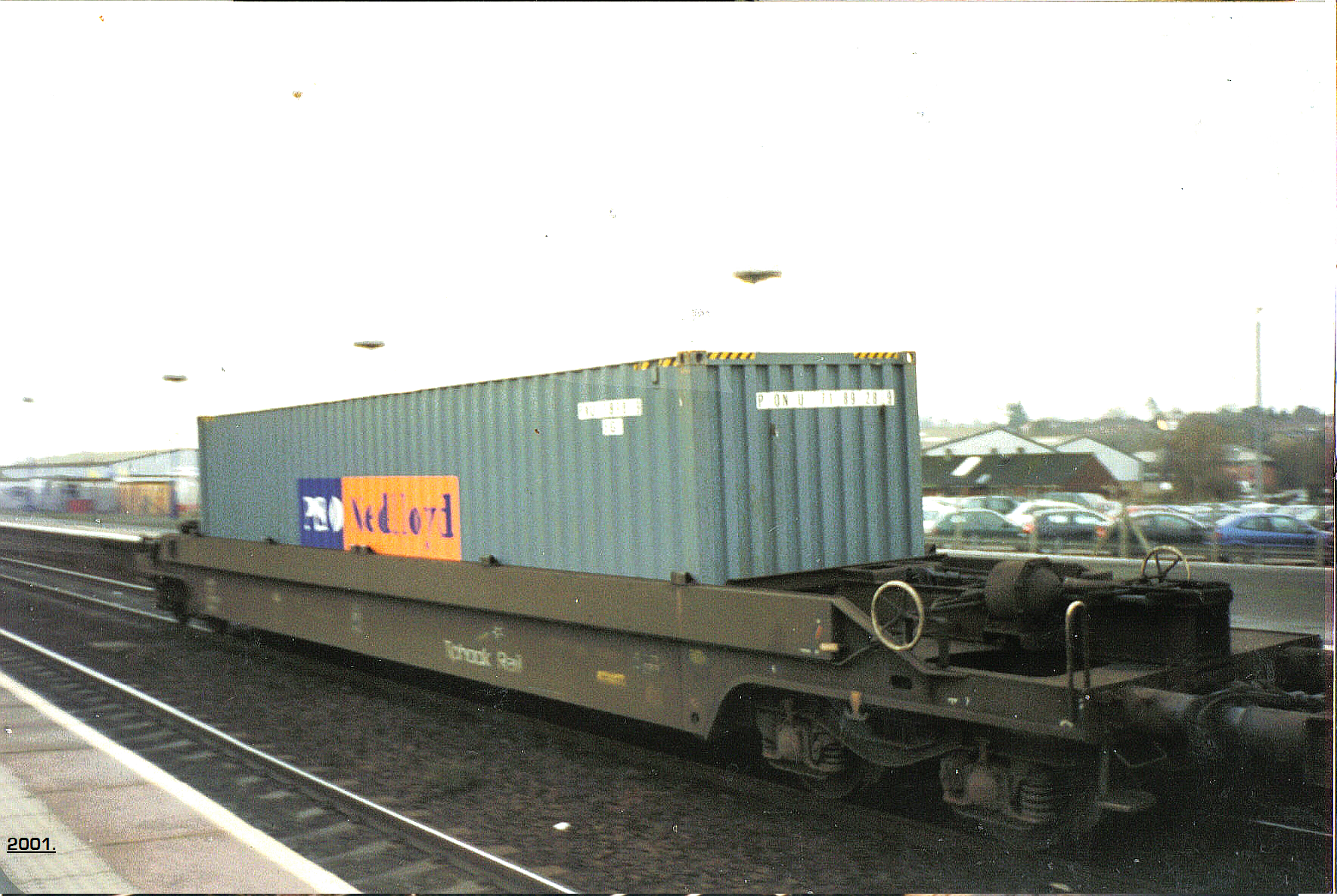
A Tiphook intermodal freight well wagon at Banbury station in the UK in 2001

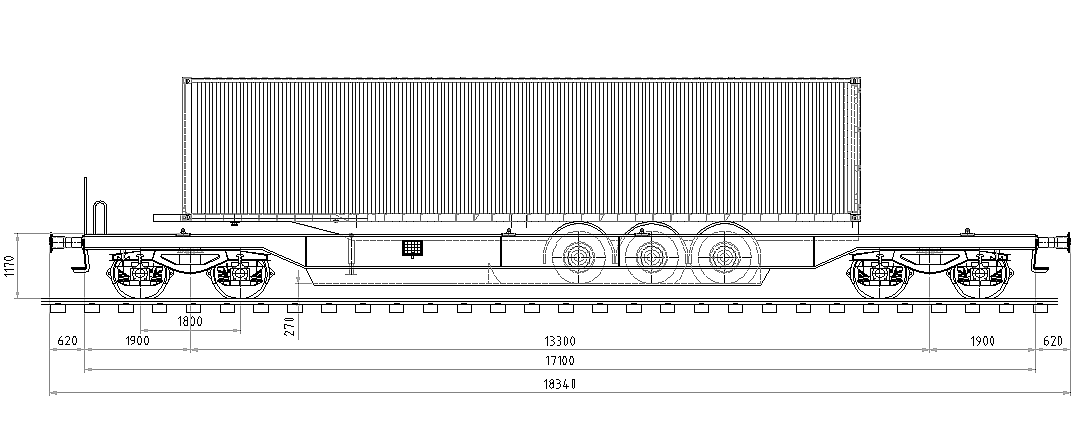
A pocket wagon

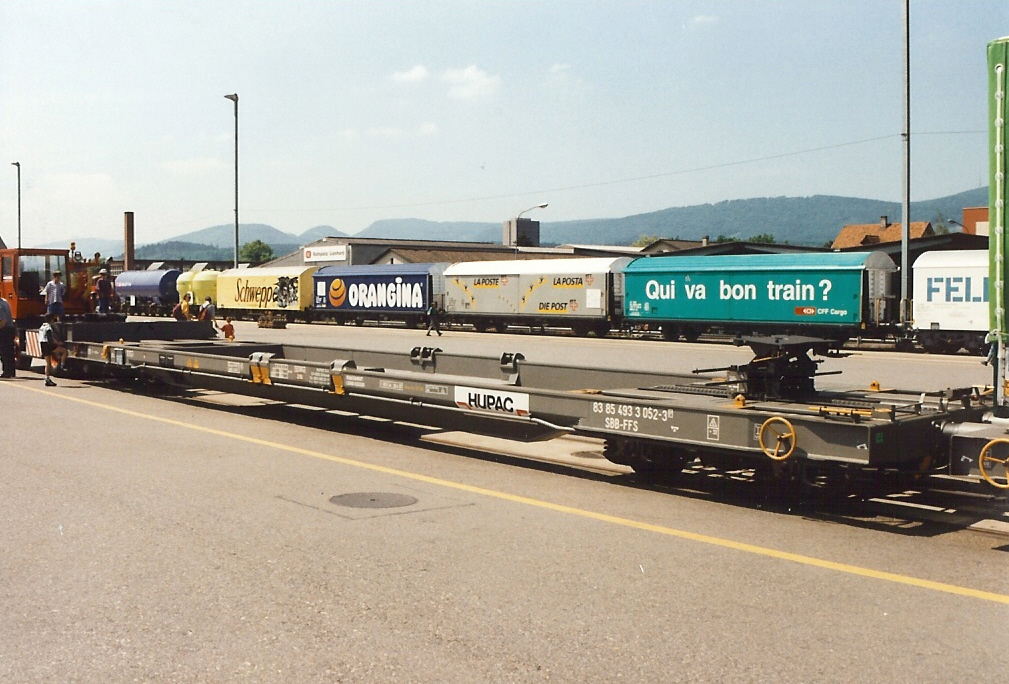
Special wagon of Hupac for semi-trailers

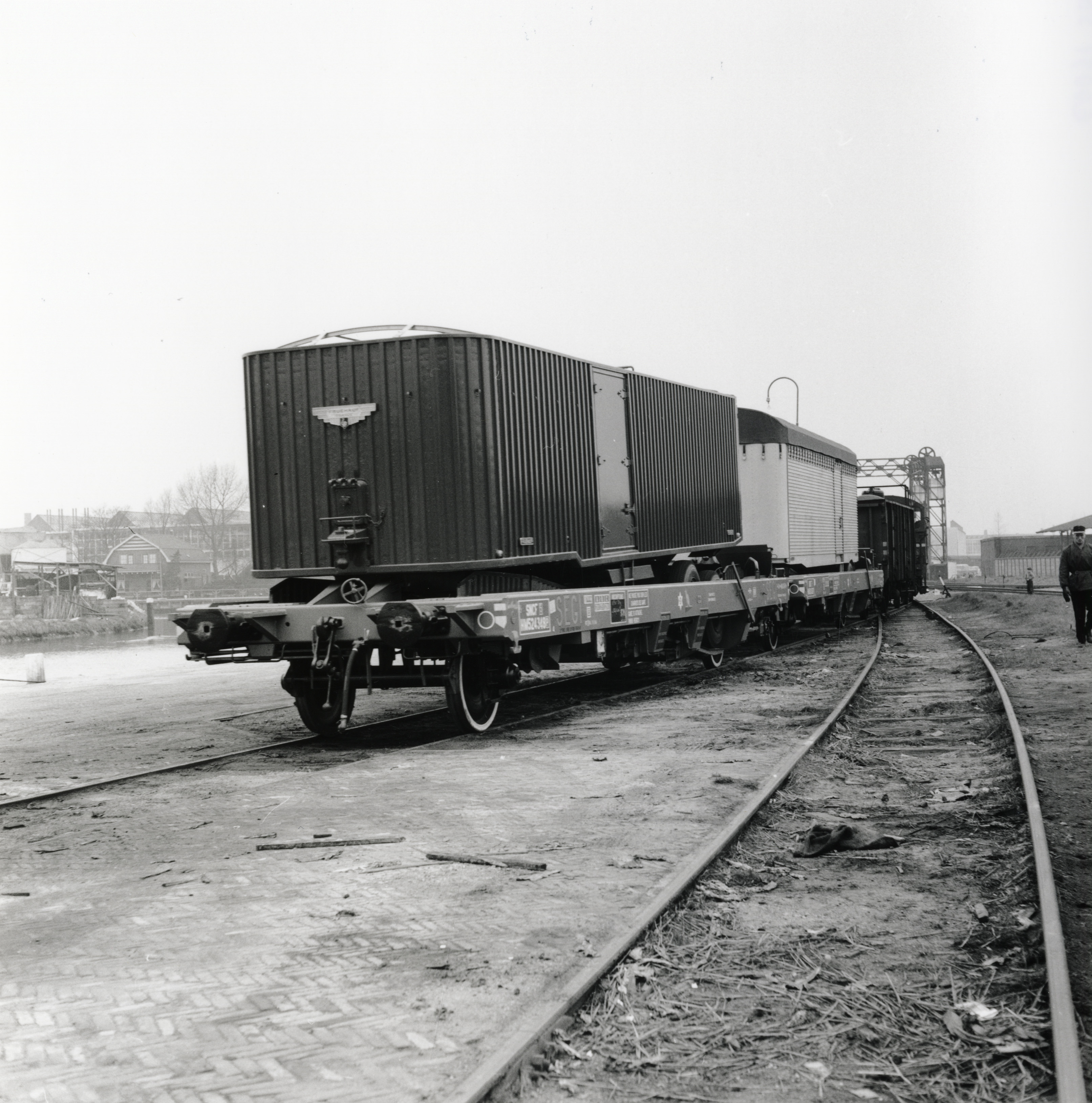
Semi-trailer on a Kangourou wagon

→

== Special low-deck wagons ==
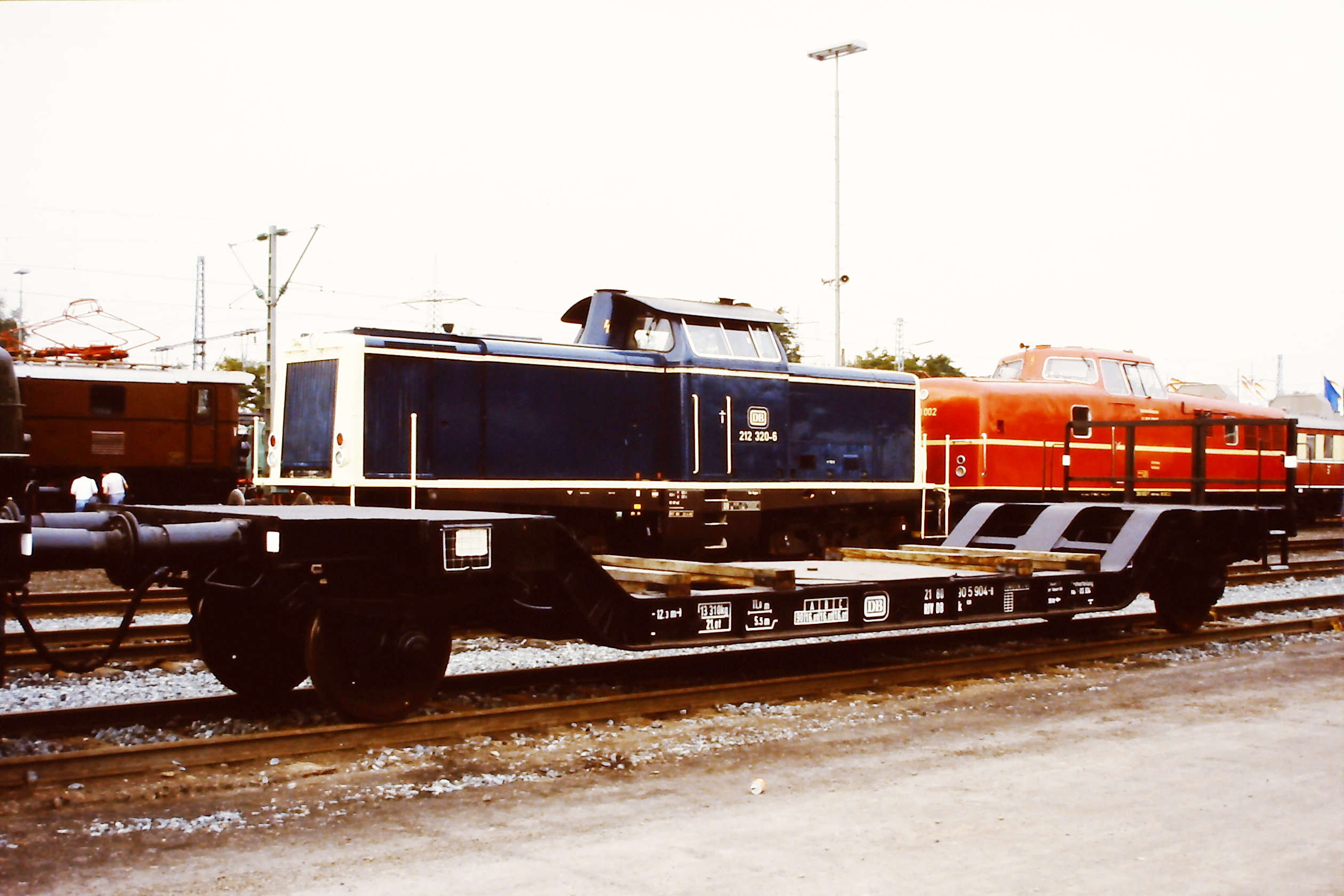
Uik 630 (21 80 990 5 904-8)

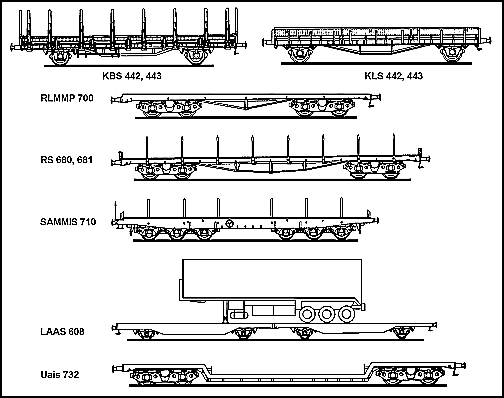
Differents types of flat wagons and one low deck wagon

This group has a large variety of different types of wagon that range from the two-axle low deck wagon to the 36-axle Schnabel wagon.

The current designation for all low deck wagons is Ui, which can be supplemented as necessary by the index letters a, aa, k, kk or s. The load limits on low-loading wagons are not indicated by letters. The former German wagon classes were St and SSt.

In 1998 the Deutsche Bahn had a total of 180 well wagons of 43 different types. They are used to move very large and heavy goods that would exceed the loading gauge on flat wagons. Such loads typically include: combine harvesters, generators or narrow gauge vehicles.

=== List of selected low deck wagons ===
Class number	Maximum carrying capacity	Tare weight	Wheelsets	Quantity (DB as at 31 Dec 1997)	Length over buffers	Bogie pivot spacing or wheelset spacing	Length of low loading bay
Uis 632	25 t (24.6 long tons; 27.6 short tons)	14,500 kg 32,000 lb	2	25	12,240 mm 40 ft 1 7/8 in	9,000 mm 29 ft 6 3/8 in	N/A
Uiks 635	19 t (18.7 long tons; 20.9 short tons)	12,800 kg 28,200 lb	2	27	15,590 mm 51 ft 1 3/4 in 15,760 mm 51 ft 8 1/2 in	9,000 mm 29 ft 6 3/8 in	7,450 mm 24 ft 5 1/4 in
Uais 732	50 t (49.2 long tons; 55.1 short tons)	29,500 kg 65,000 lb	4	16	19,940 mm 65 ft 5 in	14,900 mm 48 ft 10 5/8 in	10,000 mm 32 ft 9 3/4 in

== Schnabel wagons ==
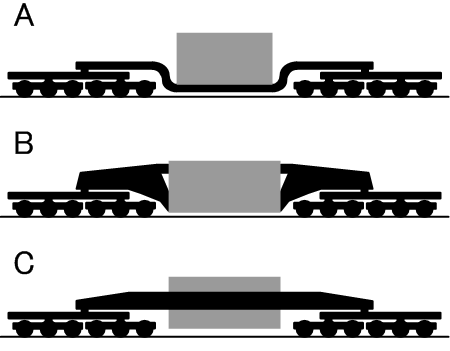
Types of wagons according the manner that they are loaded. A: Not self-supporting with low-loading bridge. B: Self-supporting load. C: Not self-supporting with through-loading bridge

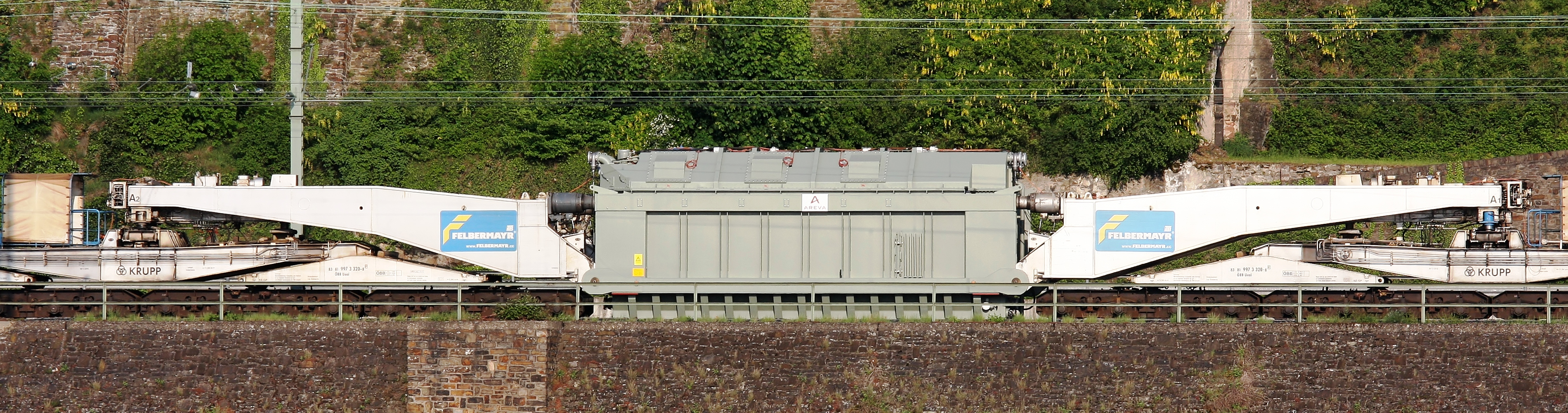
ÖBB Schnabel wagon with transformer at Koblenz-Ehrenbreitstein station

The largest low-loading wagons are designed as Schnabel wagons, made from two completely separate sections. Each section rests on multiple-axle bogies or groups of bogies. The two sections each support a beak-shaped carrying arm which, in turn, supports one side of a low-loading platform or is directly fixed to the outsize load to be transported. In the latter case the load becomes temporarily part of the vehicle itself. The wagons have hydraulic equipment with which the load can be raised or lowered in order to manoeuvre it past obstacles. There are about 30 examples of Schnabel wagon in Europe, North America and Asia.

Typical loads for these vehicles are large boilers for power stations, turbine components or power station transformers. Due to their heavy weight and outsize dimensions these goods are not usually transported in normal goods trains, but are moved in special trains and need careful preparation. Whenever transportation restrictions arise with a wagon and its load due to its weight and size, it is designated as an abnormal load and must be labelled in accordance with the RIV as a U type. When the vehicle is unladen the two carrying arms are joined directly to one another; the wagon can then travel in goods trains at normal speeds.

Schnabel wagons

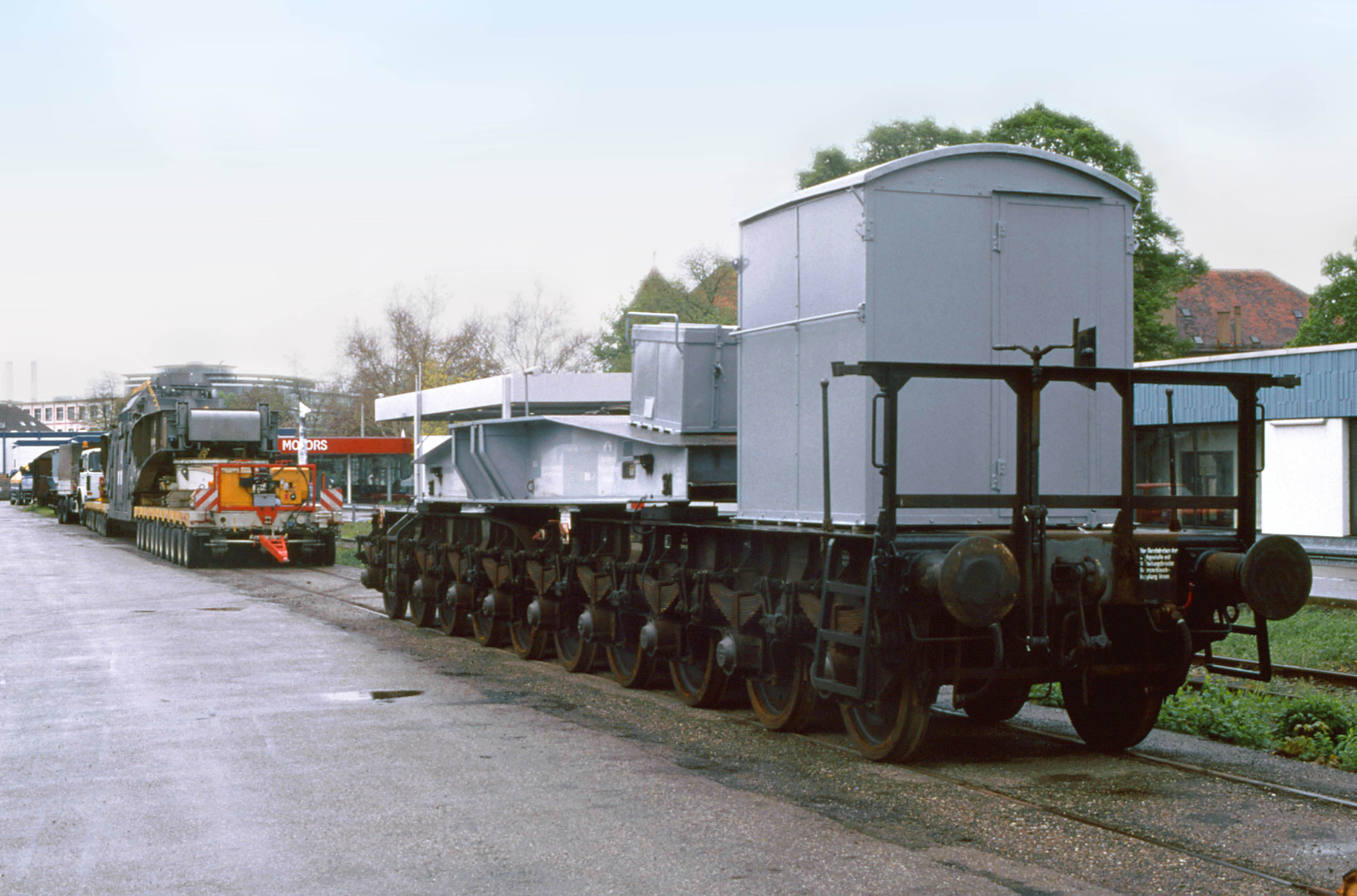
Arrival of a Schnabel wagon at its destination with a large transformer. The load will now be transported by road on a lowboy.

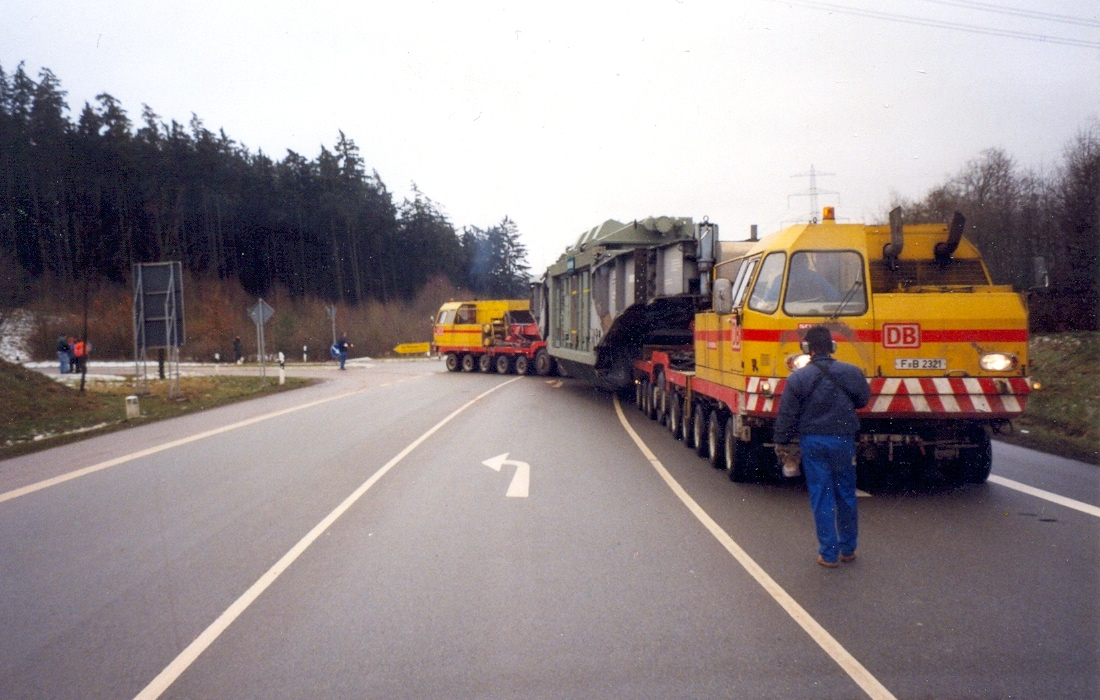
Onward transportation of the large transformer by road to the electricity substation

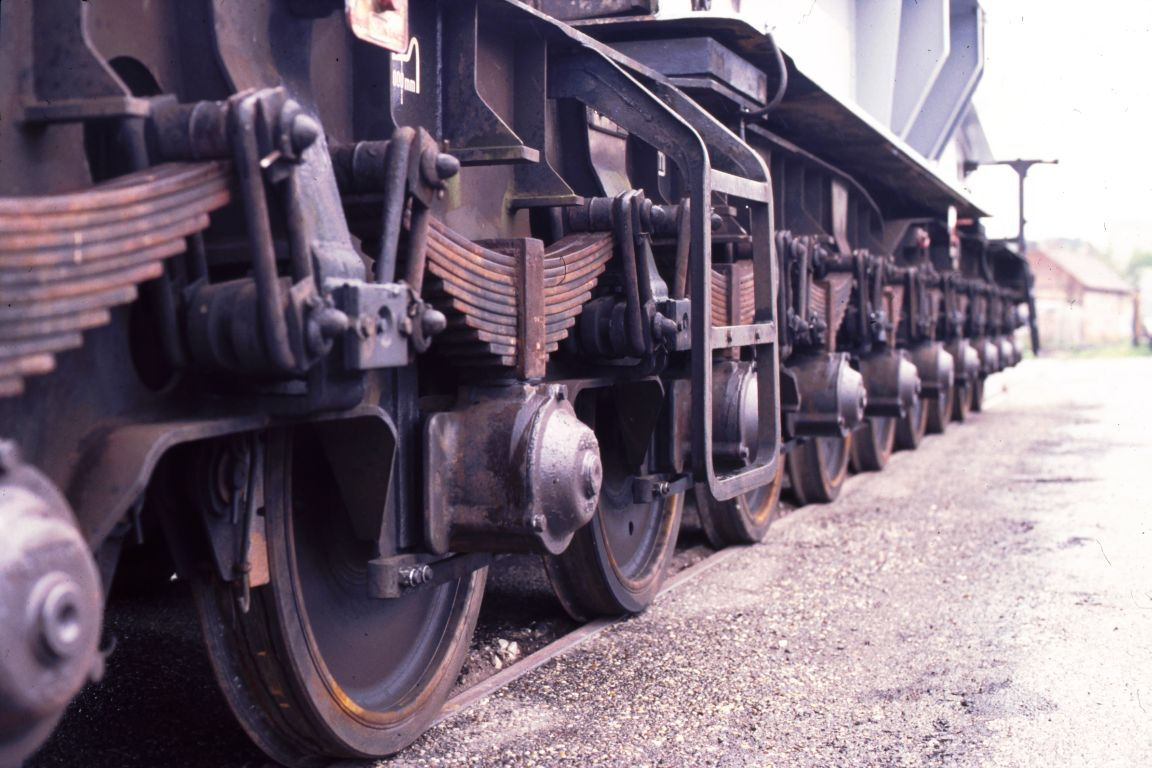
Undercarriage of a Deutsche Bahn Class Uaai 687.9 Schnabel wagon

== Hopper wagons with loading hatches ==
A range of funnel-shaped self-discharging wagons is also classed as special wagons. Their external shape resembles the open hoppers, but they have an enclosed roof with loading hatches or in some other way do not fulfil the criteria for a wagon with opening roof.

The DB has grouped several of the lime wagons with four hatches taken over from the DR into Class Uaoos-y. Some of these wagons have since been fitted with swing roofs.

In the SNCF there is a large number of grain wagons in service that are classed as special wagons.

== See also ==
- Hopper car
- Lowmac
- Open wagon
- Well car

== Literature and media ==
- "Bahn TV, Schwerlasttransporte: Riesentrafo auf Reisen; Mai 2008, Video 11 Minuten".
- Stefan Carstens: Die Güterwagen der DB AG. MIBA, Nürnberg 1998, ISBN 3-86046-030-7
