= 1986 in rail transport =

This article lists events related to rail transport that occurred in 1986.

== Events ==
=== January events ===
- January 1 – The Soo Line Railroad fully absorbs the Milwaukee Road after attempting to operate it as a subsidiary railroad.
- January 3 – Vancouver's SkyTrain begins operations between the waterfront and New Westminster.

=== February events ===
- February 8 – 23 people are killed in the Hinton train collision when a Via Rail passenger train collides with a Canadian National freight train near Hinton, Alberta.
- February 17 – Class 59 Co-Co diesel locomotives built by EMD for Foster Yeoman introduced into heavy freight service on British Rail, the first US-built (and privately owned) diesel locomotives to operate regularly on the English network.

=== March events ===
- March 3 – Shin-Narashino Station, on what is now JR East's Keiyō Line in Narashino, Chiba, Japan, is opened.
- March 24 – Edinburgh–Bathgate line in Scotland reopened to rail passengers.
- March 25 – Conrail makes its initial public offering of stock starting at US$28 per share.

=== April events ===
- April 1 – The Prince and Princess of Wales (Charles and Diana) open Heathrow Terminal 4 tube station on London Underground's Piccadilly line. Trains do not start serving the station until April 12, when the corresponding terminal starts handling flights.

=== June events ===
- June 1 – The Amsterdam–Schiphol railway is opened by Nederlandse Spoorwegen.

=== July events ===
- July 24 – The Interstate Commerce Commission denies the merger of the Santa Fe and Southern Pacific, citing an excessive amount of parallel track as one reason for the denial.
- July 26 – The Lockington rail crash at Lockington, Humberside, England occurs when a van is struck on a level crossing. Eight passengers on the train, and a boy of 11 in the van, lose their lives.

=== September events ===
- September 5 – The Dakota, Minnesota & Eastern Railroad begins operations in Minnesota and South Dakota.
- September 5 – Portland, Oregon's light rail system, MAX, opens for service.
- September 8 – The Crab Orchard & Egyptian Railroad becomes the last common carrier freight railroad in America to cease using steam locomotives as primary power when the dry-pipe in its Canadian Locomotive Company 2-8-0 No. 17 steamer collapses.
- September 14 – The Toei Shinjuku Line is extended from Funabori to Shinozaki in Tokyo, Japan; the third extension of the line since opening in 1978.
- September 19 – Two high speed trains collide near Rugeley, Staffordshire, England, in the Colwich rail crash; the driver of one of the two trains was the only fatality of this accident.

=== October events ===
- October 1 – Opening of the first phase of the Kintetsu Keihanna Line in Osaka, Japan, between Nagata Station and Ikoma Station.
- October 31 – Closure of the "Corkickle Brake" serving a chemical works at Whitehaven, Cumbria, the last commercially operated standard gauge cable railway in the United Kingdom.

=== November events ===
- November 11 – Preserved steam locomotive British Railways Standard class 8 71000 Duke of Gloucester is recommissioned on the Great Central Railway following a 13-year restoration from part-dismantled condition.
- November 15 – Australia's well known steam locomotive 3801 is recommissioned at the Hunter Valley Training Company in New South Wales.
- November 21 – The Florida Central Railroad begins operations in Florida, United States.
- November 27 – Oslo Central Station in Oslo, Norway is taken into use.

=== December events ===
- December 30 – The Trans-Gabon Railway is completed.

== Deaths ==
=== July deaths ===
- July 14 – Raymond Loewy, industrial designer who worked for the Pennsylvania Railroad designing the shape of equipment such as the GG1 (born 1893).
