= GE Capital Rail Services (Europe) =

- Company type: Private Limited Company
- Founded: 1998
- Successor: Touax
- Headquarters: Amsterdam, Netherlands
- Parent: GE Capital Solutions Europe, previously GE Equipment Services.
- Website: www.gerailservices.com

GE Capital Rail Services was a European railway services company owned by GE Capital and headquartered in Amsterdam, Netherlands. The company was formed in 1998 through the acquisition and merger of the leasing firms Cargowaggon and Tiphook.

Touax acquired the operations of GE Capital Rail Services in 2015.

== History ==
Cargowaggon was founded in Frankfurt, Germany by Swiss shipping company Danzas, to undertake trans-European shipment of customers rail cargo. The company specified and purchased wagons from mainly German manufacturers, which were then sub-leased or hired to customers.

The company was started through an invitation to manufacture and manage new rail vehicles for Ford Europe in 1979, to allow transportation of motor vehicle sub-assemblies between various European factories. By 1997 jointly owned by Australian business services company Brambles Industries, and Danzas, the company was purchased by GE Capital Services.

In May 1998, GE bought Tiphook in England, which operated 2,100 railway wagons under the Tiphook brand.

By 1999, the newly named GE Capital Rail Services had integrated Cargowaggon GmbH and International Wagon Services Ltd/Tiphook Rail Ltd, resulting in a company with offices in the UK, Germany, France, Italy and Sweden. The company had in excess of 4,600 wagons, of which 2,000 were suitable for Channel Tunnel traffic. In 1999 the fleet includes wagons for intermodal, automotive, infrastructure, construction, steel, hazardous and general cargoes.

== Railway wagons ==
=== British Rail VGA ===
British Leyland had used rail to transport a wide range of car parts between their various factories, particularly engines. In the late 1960s, British Rail modified some of its very large four wheeled ferry vans in the late 1960s, sub coded under TOPS as VQX. Via taut weather proof vinyl side curtains, these wagons allowed easy access to load a number of palletised engines. Ford started using the same wagons in the UK, including on cross-channel traffic to Germany.

In the late 1970s, Ford had sub-contracted its inter-factory transport to Danzas. As the UK had the most restrictive loading gauge in European railways, the two jointly approached British Rail to agree a new design, which resulted in Ford placing an order for private owner wagons with Cargowaggon to make a replacement for the ageing VQX. The result was a 45-foot (13.72 m) twin-axle sliding door all metal van. The design proved so successful, that in the early 1980s Ford again approached Cargowaggon for a new design, this time a slightly longer 47-foot (14.33 m) twin-axle sliding door all metal van, which was adapted by British Rail to become the VGA.

=== Cargowaggon IGA ===
So successful was the project for Cargowaggon, they extended the project. The problem of the twin axle design was that although its short length meant that it easily fitted on the cross-English Channel rail ferry, its long wheelbase restricted the minimum radius on which it could be used. The resultant longer length wagon, based on a twin EVA bogie, twin axle design, the IGA spawned three basic variants:

- Curtain sided
- Sliding metal door
- Open flat waggon

The Cargowaggon IGA is now the most commonly used trans-European railway wagon, particularly popular since the opening of the Channel Tunnel, resulting in a design which has been improved over the developing years as opposed to replaced.

== See also ==
- GE Capital Rail Services, North American rail leasing branch of GE
- List of rolling-stock leasing companies
