= Touax =

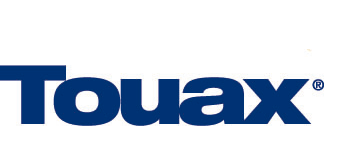
- Traded as: Euronext: TOUP; CAC Small
- Industry: Operational leasing company
- Founded: 1853
- Headquarters: Paris, France
- Area served: Worldwide
- Website: Official website

Touax (also known as Touax Group) is a French operational leasing company. Its four businesses are river barges, modular buildings, freight railcars, and shipping containers.

== History ==
Touax was formed on 14 July 1853 as "Compagnie de Touage de la Basse Seine et de l’Oise". French imperial decrees, signed by Napoleon III, and granted to Eugène Godeaux on 6 April 1854 and 14 July 1855, gave the company its statutes for operation. It was charged to operate a river transport service on the Seine and Oise rivers.

In 1898 the company merged with Société de Touage et de Remorquage de l’Oise, and changed its name to "Société Générale de Touage et de Remorquage" (a name it held until 1994). On 7 May 1906 the company listed on the Paris stock exchange. Over the years the company diversified from river barges into freight railcars and shipping containers. It has expanded globally throughout Europe, and into North and South America, and Asia.

In the 1980s the company created Touax Corporation in the United States. The company changed its name to Touax, as well as consolidated all its business under a single entity, in 1994. The company is currently headed by members of the Walewski family.

== Touax companies ==
=== River barges ===
Touax River Barges is the division of Touax which deals with river transport since the company's formation in 1855. By 1898 the company towed almost 75% of the traffic on the Seine and 70% on the Oise.

=== Freight railcars ===
In 1954 the company ordered its first railcars, which were then managed by two independent operators. Touax acquired the operations of GE Capital Rail Services in Europe in 2015.

=== Shipping containers ===
Touax container in South Africa, 2017

In 1975 Touax moved into shipping containers, and in 1985 acquired Gold Container Corporation – now one of the largest shipping container lessors in the world.
