= List of rolling-stock leasing companies =

List of rolling-stock leasing companies.

== Australia ==
- Consolidated Rail Leasing
- Rail First Asset Management

== Finland ==
- Suomen Ostoliikennekalusto

== Germany ==
- Railpool

== Ireland ==
- NS Financial Services Company

== Japan ==
- Mitsui Rail Capital

== Luxembourg ==
- CBrail

== Netherlands ==
- GE Capital Rail Services (Europe)

== South Africa ==
- Sheltam

== Sweden ==
- Transitio

== Switzerland ==
- European Loc Pool

== United Kingdom ==
- Angel Trains
- Beacon Rail
- Caledonian Rail Leasing
- Eversholt Rail Group
- GE Capital
- Halifax Asset Finance
- Macquarie European Rail
- Lombard North Central
- Porterbrook
- Rock Rail

== United States ==
- Citirail
- First Union Rail (formerly)
- GE Capital Rail Services (formerly)
- Marmon Holdings
  - Union Tank Car Company
- Wells Fargo Rail (formerly)
