= Kangourou wagon =

Rail wagon designed for the transport of semi-trailers

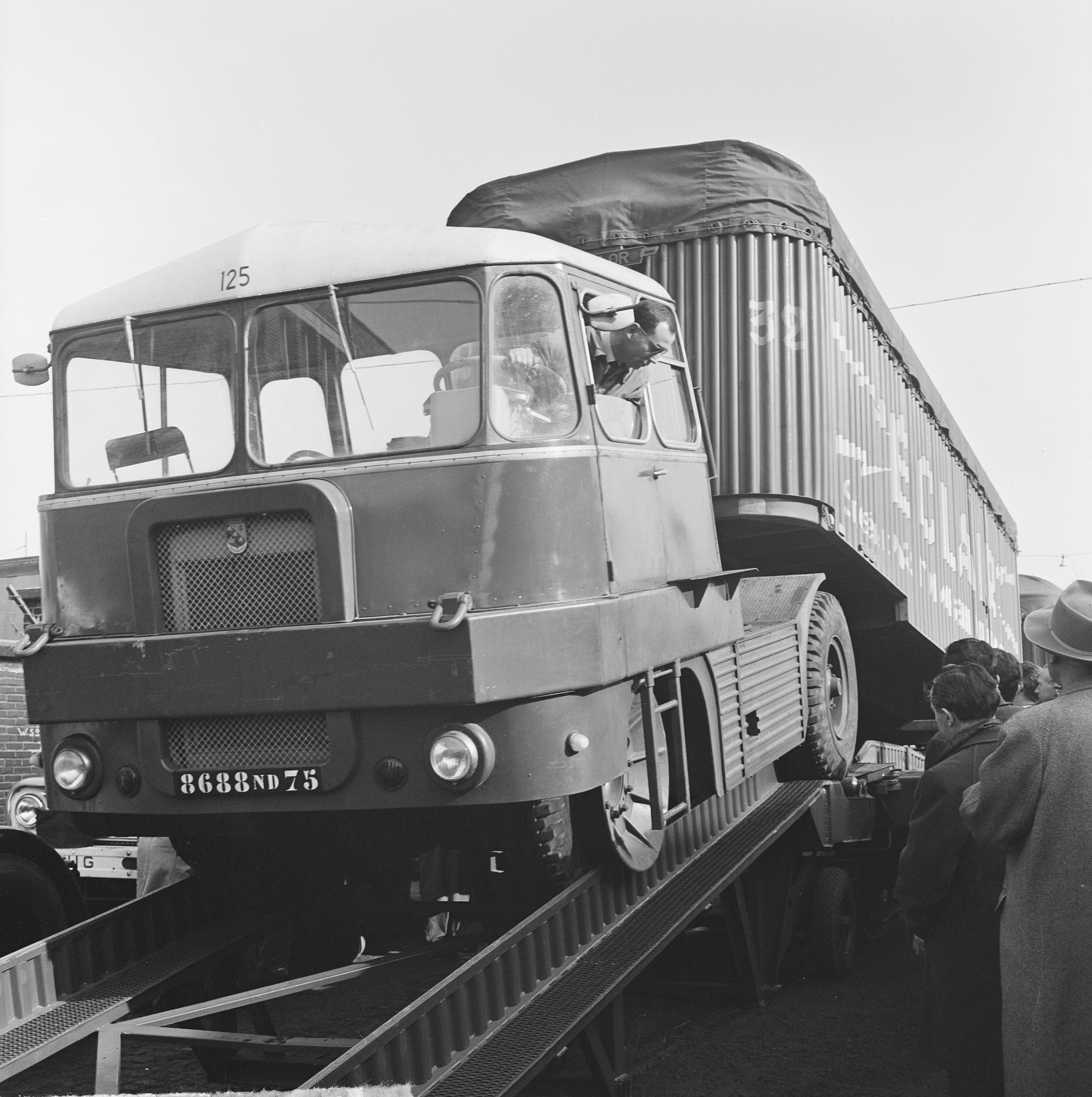
Unloading a semi-trailer truck from a kangourou wagon

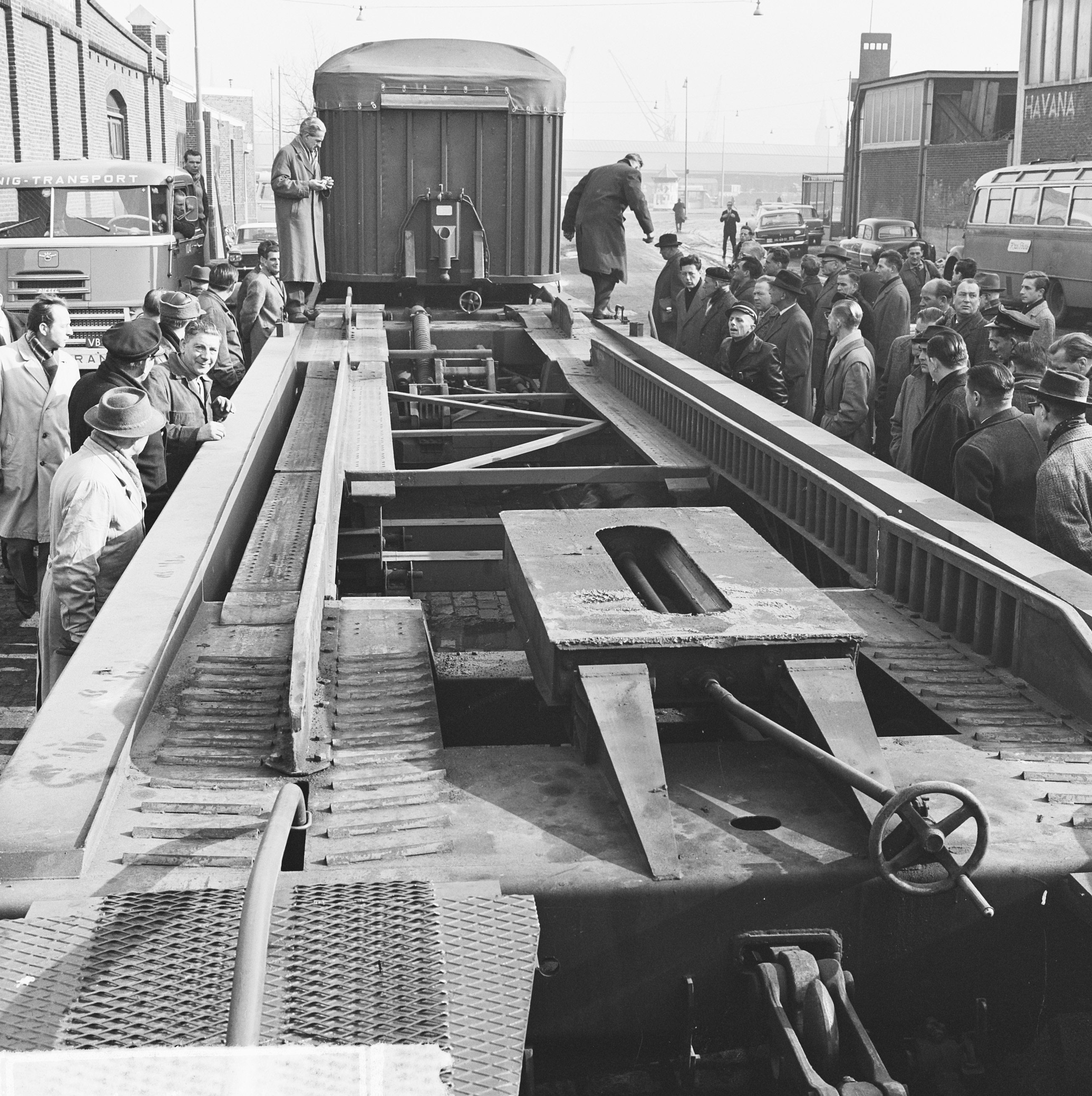
Deck of a kangourou wagon

The kangourou wagon ("kangaroo wagon") is a type of rail wagon designed for the transport of semi-trailers. It has a drawbridge forming a pocket in the low position (hence its name) allowing the carrier train (2 or 3 axles) of the semi-trailer to be placed and thus to respect the height of the loading gauge ( 4.2 m or 13 ft 9 3/8 in above top of rail for the loading gauge of the UIC).

These are special open wagons. The axle models are UIC K type, their bogie S type counterparts.

== In France ==
The "kangaroo wagon" is the continuation of the UFR wagon. The latter no longer meeting transport requirements, a new type of wagon was studied for the transport of semi-trailer s but this time taking as a basis a standard trailer and not an adapted trailer.

=== Axle wagon ===
The first type of kangaroo wagon is a twin-axle model weighing 11 t (11 long tons; 12 short tons) of tare, having a length of 12.02 m (39 ft 5 1/4 in) and accepting a load of 20 t (20 long tons; 22 short tons). This wagon is within the limits of load, length and wheelbase, fixed by the International Union of Railways (UIC), with a wheelbase of 9 m (29 ft 6 3/8 in).

This type of wagon was designated KE, Kangourou à Axieux, and was built in 246 units divided into 4 orders from 1958 to 1963.

The wagon is distinguished by:

- a manoeuvrable drawbridge which can occupy two positions:
  - high position for the passage from one wagon to another
  - low position to accommodate the wheels of the semi-trailer, which rest on the wagon frame
- guide rails for the semi-trailer on the chassis, on the gangways and on the drawbridge
- and a fifth-wheel coupling for the longitudinally adjustable semi-trailer.

The kangaroo wagons run in block trains of several dozen wagons. They are necessarily all oriented in the same direction, otherwise the loading and unloading operations would be impossible.

However, and this from 1962, new regulations in the highway code, new tractors with short cabins and new measures taken by the French National Railway Company (SNCF) make this type of wagon outdated. In fact, as the technique evolves, we have:

- a change from 35 to 38 t (34 to 37 long tons; 39 to 42 short tons) for the weight of the road assemblies with as a corollary a weight of the semi-trailer of up to 32 t (31 long tons; 35 short tons),
- a change from 14 to 15 m (45 ft 11 1/8 in to 49 ft 2 1/2 in) for the length of road assemblies,
- and the placing on the market of a short tractor, with as a corollary of these two points a length of the semi-trailer which can be up to 12.20 m (40 ft 3/8 in),
- an ability to travel at up to 120 km/h (75 mph) on the courier trains,
- and finally, with a view to the application of the automatic coupling, a design that can accommodate it.

=== Bogie wagon ===
As written above, the axle wagon was very quickly superseded, the SNCF and SEGI (France) decide to design a new wagon from 1965 but with bogies this time, to be able to accept the new standards. In addition, the design provides a margin to absorb possible new regulations increasing the weight and length of semi-trailers.

Thus from 1967 to 1968 a total of 80 wagons built in two series are delivered:

- series 5 with screw brake for 40 wagons,
- the 6 series without screw brake for 40 wagons.

The construction uses folded and welded sheets with braking equipment at the ends. These wagons weigh 18.5 t (18.2 long tons; 20.4 short tons) of tare, have a length of 15 m (49 ft 2 1/2 in) and accept a load of 33 t (32 long tons; 36 short tons) and are mounted on Y 29 bogies allowing them a maximum speed of 120 km/h (75 mph). All these wagons were designed to run as block trains, cannot pass through the marshalling hump and remained the property of SEGI.

This wagon was designated SK: Super Kangourou.

From 1968 to 1969 a new wagon is studied by taking the characteristics of the previous wagon but with mechanically welded sections instead of sheets. These wagons weigh 17.5 t (17.2 long tons; 19.3 short tons) of tare, have a length of 15 m (49 ft 2 1/2 in) and accept a load of 33 t (32 long tons; 36 short tons) and are mounted on Y 31 C bogies allowing them a maximum speed of 120 km/h (75 mph).

The order covered a total of 440 wagons distributed as follows:

- series 7 for 50 wagons
- series 8 for 50 wagons
- series 10 for 50 wagons
- series 11 for 70 wagons
- series 13 for 50 wagons
- series 14 for 40 wagons
- the 16 series for 50 wagons
- the 18 series for 80 wagons

Of all these series, only one remained the property of the SNCF: series 8.

This wagon (UIC Sss type) were designated KB: Kangourou à Bogies.

However from 1966 competition arrives with the containers. The SNCF is quickly moving towards this type of transport and tests are being carried out to ensure the handling of semi-trailerss in the same way.

The company Novatrans which manages the piggyback decides in 1977 to only do vertical handling and to gradually abandon horizontal handling. Studies were being undertaken to transform the fleet of kangaroo wagons into container wagons or "pocket wagons" intended to receive the semi-trailers handled vertically. The modified wagons became respectively 'KC' from series 11 and 'KM' from series 7, 13, 14, 16 and 18.

Unfortunately the traffic declines quickly and in 1983 it was the abandonment of the horizontal handling with the corollary of again immediately modifying the wagons of the series 18 were being modified in ' KM 'to give the' K1 '. All other 'KM' were gradually changed to 'K1' as the revisions progress.

The wagons of the 10 series were, for their part, transformed into container ships in 1984, giving the series 'KU' .

The wagons of the 8 series, belonging to the SNCF are for their part transformed into container wagons in 1984 giving the series 'K9' . These wagons were leased to Novatrans which returned them in 2005.

In 2006 the wagons were written off and in 2007 all the stock was demolished except about ten wagons kept by the SEGI.

The wagons of series 5 and 6 due to the side members in folded sheets could not be modified and were returned by Novatrans to SEGI from December 1986 to January 1988 and in 1989 76 wagons were sold to GEFCO to be transformed into automobile carriers.

=== Medium annexes ===
At the beginning the semi-trailer was handled by a special tractor with the use of a loading / unloading ramp then during vertical handling it was a crane or a gantry crane after reinforcement of the semi-trailer to the right of the grip by the grippers.

== Situation in Europe ==
This combined transport solution has been in operation since the years 1970 throughout Europe. But it is not comparable to the rail motorway because it requires a different logistics organization: Handling by specific road tractor or by crane or by gantry, exchange of road tractor at the start and at the arrival. In return, it offers a good ratio payload to towed mass: 50% (for a semi-trailer (13.5 m (44 ft)) of 9 t (8.9 long tons; 9.9 short tons) loaded with 25 t (25 long tons; 28 short tons) of goods) because it is not carrying the tractor unit (approximately 6 t (5.9 long tons; 6.6 short tons)). But in 2000 the "rolling" road experienced a resurgence of interest (even if this revival is for the moment weak in France) and the traffic of semi-trailers fades in favor of the whole container.

In Germany, the following types are distinguished:

- T1 Sdgkms ^{707} ex Skss-z ^{707} (1973) of 16.44 m (53.9 ft) and payload 33 t (32 long tons; 36 short tons),
- T3 Sdgmns ^{743} (1990s) of 18.34 m (60.2 ft), payload 62.5 t (61.5 long tons; 68.9 short tons) (containers) for 20.4 t (20.1 long tons; 22.5 short tons) de tare
- T4: this type of 18.28 m (60.0 ft) admits a payload of 69 t (68 long tons; 76 short tons) (containers) or 38 t (37 long tons; 42 short tons) (semi-trailer),
- Sdggmrs ^{744} / Sdggmrs ^{739}: these are articulated wagons with 3 bogies; the 739 series is suitable for 140 km/h (87 mph),
- T2000 Sdggmrss ^{736}
- T3000 variant optimized for Mega-trailer trailers of 3 m (9.8 ft) internal height.

== Model making ==
- The kangaroo wagon with axles was offered at H0 scale by Jouef individually or in a set comprising 2 wagons, including the tractor and the loading / unloading ramp.
- Kangaroo bogie wagons have been offered in H0 by Märklin / Trix and Roco.
- The kangaroo bogie wagon is also offered in H0 by LS Models, but for the moment only in its 'KB version: KM, K1, KC, ...' therefore pocket wagons.
- Since 2015, the kangaroo wagon with axles is offered by REE-Models at H0 scale individually or in a set comprising two wagons (and two trailers), a tractor and a ramp loading / unloading.

== See also ==
- Tiphook
- Well car
