= Corkickle Brake =

Inclined railway in Cumbria, England

Coordinates: 54.5360°N 3.5882°W

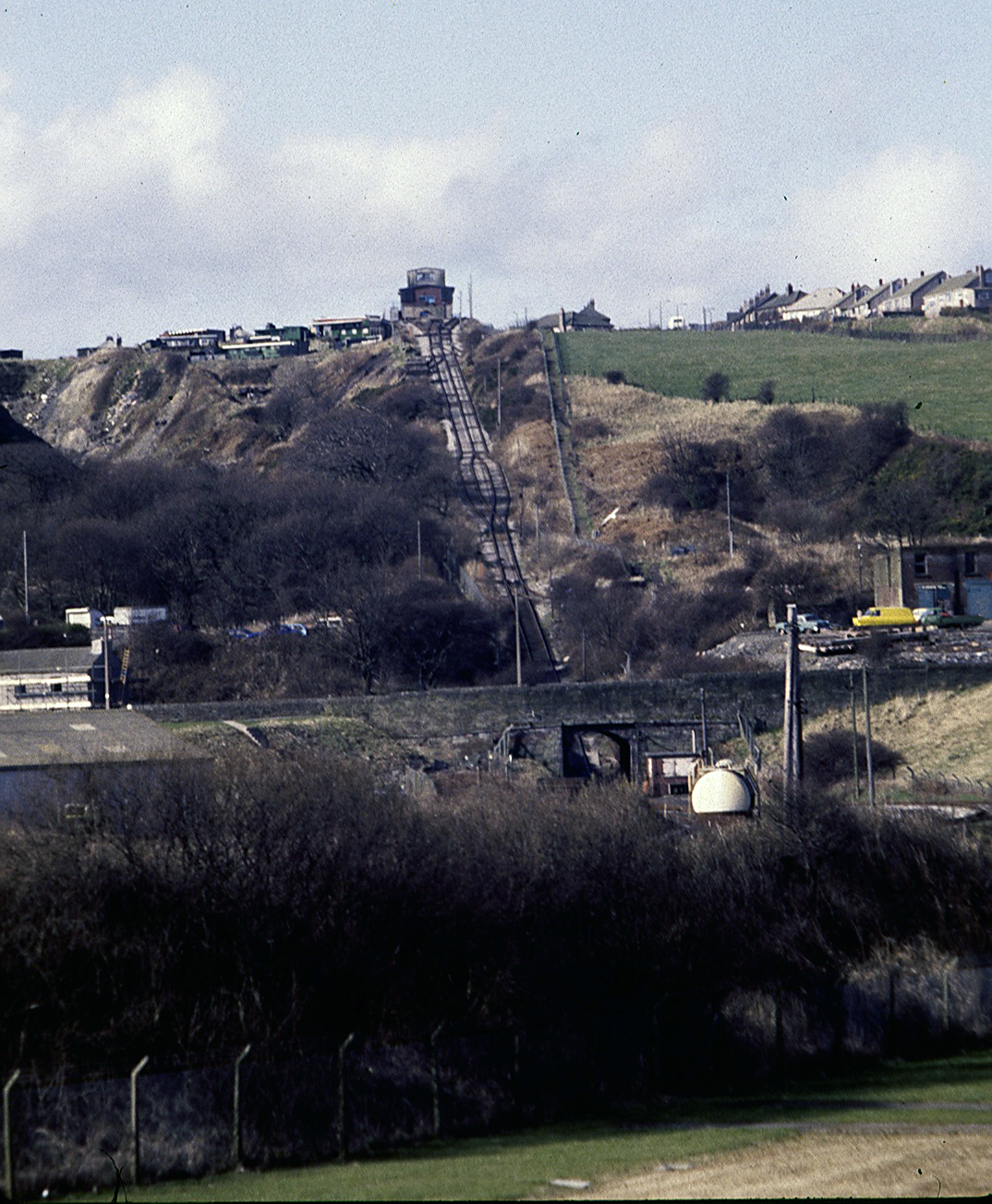
- Corkickle Rope Incline Wagon Hoist

Overview
- Other name(s): Kells Brake; Marchon Brake; Monkwray Brake
- Status: Closed
- Locale: Whitehaven, Cumbria, England

Service
- Type: Heavy rail

History
- Opened: 1880
- 1933: Mothballed
- 1955: Re-opened
- 1986: Closed completely

Technical
- Line length: 525 yards (480 m)
- Track gauge: 4 ft 8 1/2 in (1,435 mm) standard gauge
- Operating speed: 8 miles per hour (13 km/h) (max speed)
- Highest elevation: 300 feet (90 m) (Incline top)

The Corkickle Brake was a standard-gauge incline railway in Whitehaven, Cumbria, England. The incline was built in 1880 to transfer coal from the mines on the cliffs of the Cumbrian coast near to Whitehaven, to the railway line inland at Corkickle. When the coal mines ceased operation, the incline was closed (1933), but later re-opened to serve products going into, and out of, the Marchon chemical works on the cliff. The railway closed in 1986, and was the last standard-gauge incline railway in England. (Note: Another standard-gauge railway was operating at South Hetton in County Durham in 1986. It is not known if operations there (for hauling coal) outlived the Corkickle Brake, but most railway historians agree that the Corkickle Brake was the last standard gauge operating incline in England.)

== History ==
The Corkickle Brake opened in 1881 to connect the Whitehaven Colliery Company's Croft pit with the Furness Line (Barrow to Whitehaven) just to the south of Corkickle station. The development of the Corkickle Brake came about because the Earl of Lonsdale (who owned Croft Colliery) felt he was being charged too much by the harbour trustees to move his coal along the Howgill Brake; so a direct route down to some new sidings at Corkickle was also supported by the Furness Railway, as that would mean potentially less coal traffic travelling through the single-bore Bransty Tunnel. The brake was approved in 1881, and completed in the same year, costing around £5,000, which the earl of Lonsdale would pay back to the Furness Railway at an annual payment of £1,000. The foot of the brake was located at around 33 feet (10 m) above sea level, and the head of the incline is around the 300 feet (90 m) mark; so the incline travelled just over 250 feet (76 m) in height.

Initially, it forwarded coal, but later was used to move coke from Ladysmith Colliery too, but during a depression in the market in the 1930s, the collieries closed, and so too the incline, becoming an asset of the National Coal Board in 1947. When the Marchon (Later Albright & Wilson) works was established on the hilltop in the 1950s to the west of the brake (on an old colliery), products were railed into, and out of the works, using the Howgill Brake. The Howgill Brake was located to the north of Corkickle Brake, and was rebuilt in 1925, replacing an earlier incline; it was used to take coal traffic directly down into the docks at Whitehaven from the pits on the clifftop.

Traffic proved to be quite heavy, and so to avoid using the Howgill Brake (Note: The Howgill Brake was closed in 1972 after a landslide.) and Whitehaven Docks, the Marchon Company applied to use the Corkickle Brake and it was rebuilt and relaid, opening in May 1955, the last standard-gauge incline to be built in Britain. Tonnages moved increased so much, that in 1964, over 500,000 tonnes (490,000 long tons; 550,000 short tons) was moved over the incline, which led to the company proposing a new line direct into the works from St Bees (further south) which would have to climb over 250 feet (76 m) in under 3 miles (5 km). Permission was sought from Parliament, but it was opposed by landowners, and British Rail would only commit to two trains per day over the line, which was not enough to sustain the volume of traffic.

The enginehouse was at the top of the incline, with a level crossing just west of the incline top. The control cabin for the incline was moved onto the top of the enginehouse in 1972, finally giving the operator a clear view down the entire length of the incline. The incline had a gradient of 1-in-5.2 to 1-in-6 and a length of 525 yards (480 m), but on both ends of the incline, sidings and connections provided a longer system. (Note: The connection from the incline top into the works was about 0.75 miles (1.21 km) long, and was owned and operated by Marchon, part of the agreement between the Marchon company and the NCB who handed over most of the railway system to the chemical company.) Catch points connected to sand drags were built into the rails of the incline, which would be activated if any wagon passed a speed of 9 miles per hour (14 km/h) on the descent, and the points would operate automatically. the typical operating speed for the incline was rated at 8 miles per hour (13 km/h) max speed, though the catch points and sand drags were not installed until 1975. Traffic would be hauled up and down the incline between 06:00 and 22:00 on a two-shift basis, though sometimes, working would be 24-hourly with a third shift. Lakeland Avenue had a level crossing just to the west of the enginehouse, and increased traffic led to a petition to the council to stop rail traffic during the night, Sundays and Bank Holidays due to the amount of time that the crossing was closed to vehicles and pedestrians. A footbridge was provided on the edge of the enginehouse when the crossing gates were closed.

One siding at the bottom of the incline was elevated with a small downhill gradient towards the incline bottom; this allowed for incoming wagons to be loaded onto the rope and hauled up the incline more easily than a level siding. Two lower level sidings were built with a downhill gradient (towards the main Cumbrian Coast Line) to allow them to move under gravity into the sorting sidings. Usually, ascending wagons would be counter-balanced by descending wagons, but in case there was no product going in or out to provide a counterbalance, redundant coal hoppers (HTVs) were kept on site to provide this. Another incline, with a gentler gradient, crossed underneath the Corkickle brake where it had the three-rail section. This was a 300 yards (270 m) line which supplied clay and shale to the brickworks to the north of the brake.

The incline was closed in 1986 due to a combination of dwindling traffic, its inability to handle larger tank wagons, and the need for major refurbishments. It was the last known operating standard-gauge incline railway in England, ending over 180 years of standard-gauge rope-worked inclines. An area around the incline's summit is known locally as Braketop. The last commercial movements on the incline took place in October 1986 (the incline officially closed on 31 October 1986), but on 4 November 1986, the last two locomotives were taken down to be preserved at Derwent Railway Society's location in Workington. After closure, the line was mothballed but was not disconnected from the Cumbrian Coast Line until 1992.

== See also ==
- Honister Slate Mine
- Shap Summit
