= TIP Group =

International truck trailer leasing company

- Formerly: Transport International Pool; GE Trailer Fleet Services
- Predecessor: GE Trailer Fleet Services
- Founded: 1968; 58 years ago
- Headquarters: Amsterdam, Netherlands
- Area served: Europe
- Key people: Arjen Kraaij (CEO); Bob Fast (President); Hans van Lierop (CFO); Hiske Damhuis (CHRO); Paul Beadle (COO)
- Services: Full-service equipment provider: leasing & rental, maintenance, repair, refurbishment, digital services, sale of used equipment
- Revenue: €955 million (2021)
- Net income: €48.7 million (2021)
- Owner: I Squared Capital
- Number of employees: 2,808 (2021)
- Website: www.tip-group.com

TIP Group was founded in 1968, as Transport Pool Inc. and is an international provider of transportation and logistics equipment services, headquartered in Amsterdam, Netherlands. The company offers leasing, rental, maintenance, sale of used equipment, and digital solutions for trucks, trailers, e-vehicles and other specialised equipment.

As of 2024, TIP Group operates in 17 countries across Europe, with a fleet of approximately 90,000 assets and a network of 130 service locations.

== History ==
TIP depot in Knottingley.

TIP Group was founded in 1968 as Transport Pool Inc. (TP), initially operating in the United States with branches in Canada and the Netherlands and later the United Kingdom.

In 1971 TP began operating in Belgium, and by 1975 TP was also operating in Ireland and Sweden, when it was acquired by Minneapolis-based Gelco Corporation. In 1976 the company was renamed Transport International Pool Inc. (TIP) to better reflect the company's international nature. In 1986 TIP spun off its European operations to a management and investor consortium.

In 1993, TIP was acquired by GE Capital. With GE Capital, TIP expanded its European network. In 2007, TIP expanded its offer by introducing services like maintenance and repair services as well as telematics. In October 2013, TIP was acquired by HNA Group, a Chinese conglomerate.

In 2013, TIP was acquired by China-based HNA Group. The company also supported several acquisitions, including Grayrentals in the UK and Toscon in the Netherlands, to broaden its capabilities.

In 2016, TIP Trailer Services Group acquired Train Trailer Rental Ltd, a Canadian provider of trailer rentals, leasing and storage. In that same year TIP acquired Dutch rental and leasing company Twan Heetkamp Trailers (THT), which had a fleet of around 3,000 trailers operating across Europe.

In 2018, HNA Group sold its European TIP subsidiary to I Squared Capital for a sum of around €1 billion. In August 2018, I Squared Capital (ISQ) acquired 100 percent interest in TIP. During this period, the company owned a fleet of 66,000 trailers and 86 trailer service centre.

In 2024, TIP's Canadian operations merged with Transportation Equipment Network (TEN), allowing the company to focus more intensively on its European business.

== Workshops ==
Country	Number of workshops
United Kingdom	27
Ireland	1
Denmark	8
Finland	5
Norway	4
Sweden	7
France	16
Italy	5
Spain	6
Germany	22
Poland	7
Austria	3
Netherlands	16
Belgium	1
Total	128

== Logotype ==
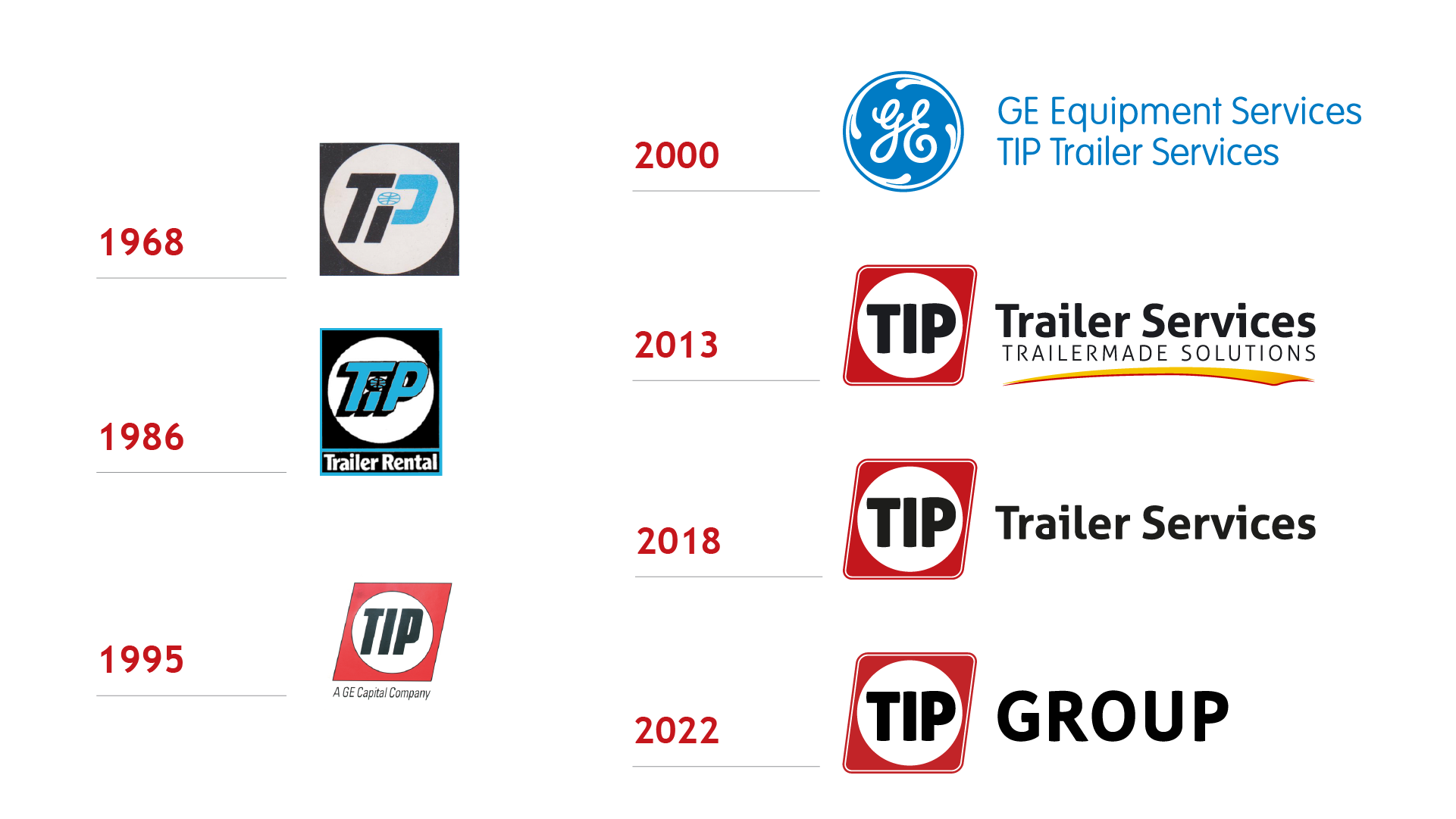
TIP Group Logo Evolution
