= Lowmac =

Specialty rail wagon for transporting vehicles

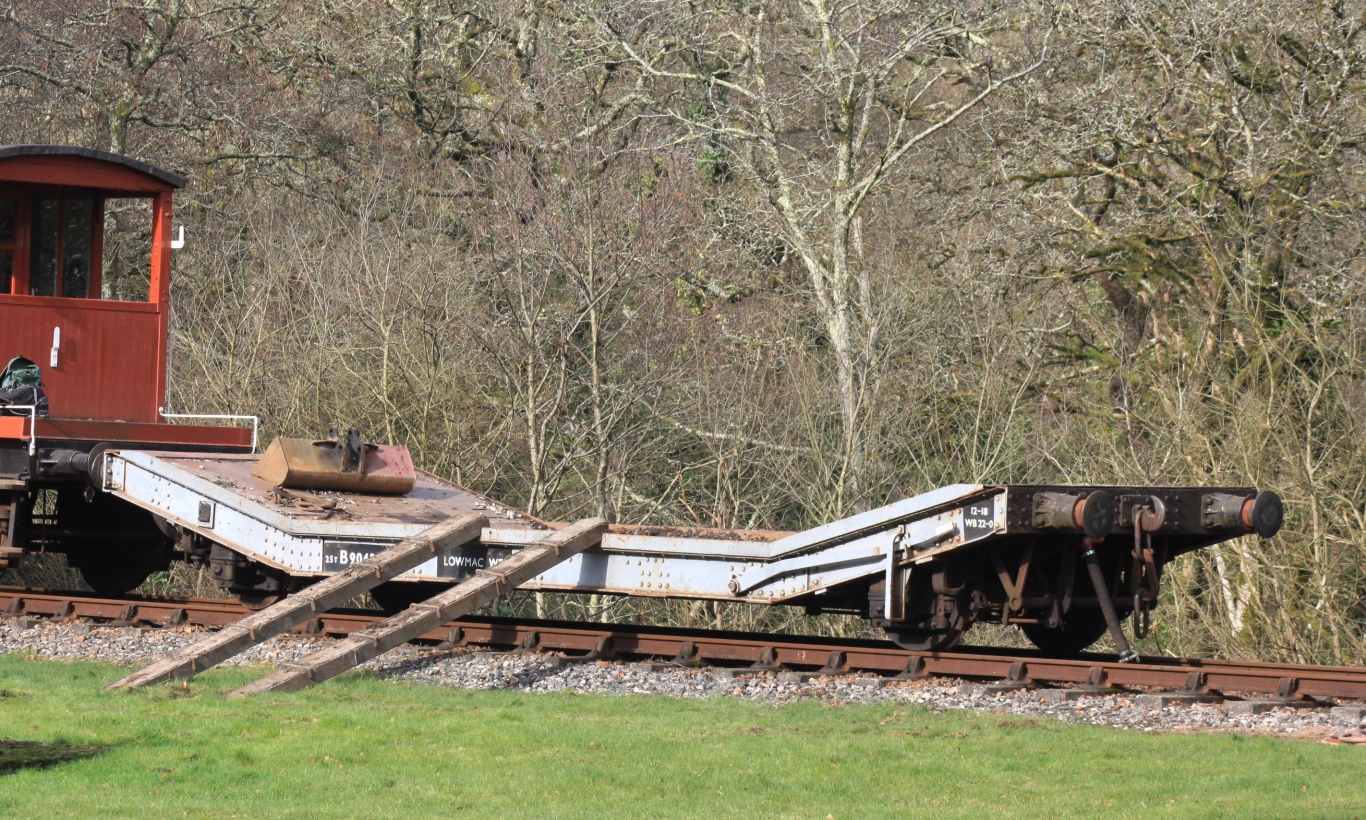
A British Railways' Lowmac preserved on the Bodmin and Wenford Railway

Lowmac is a United Kingdom railway term for a design of low-floored ('well') wagon. A Lowmac's purpose is for carrying vehicles or equipment that would normally be over the recommended height of a normal flatbed wagon, and hence exceed the loading gauge.

== History ==
'Lowmac' is the telegraphic term within the Great Western Railway's coding of railway wagons for a flat wagon with a recessed floor. In full the code is 'Low Machine Wagon'; meaning a wagon with a low floor used for carrying machinery. The term was also employed by British Railways but as an actual wagon name.

Lowmac style wagons were widely used throughout the 1890s till the 1950s when road transport was able to take their loads of machinery and vehicles. Most were removed from service and were scrapped by British Railways because they were replaced by more modern bogie wagons such as warwell wagons. However, some wagons were re-coded to a Z code (under the TOPS programme), and survived in Departmental use (non-revenue earning traffic) being used in engineering trains typically carrying lineside equipment such as transformers for overhead electrification works.

== See also ==
- Class U special wagon
- Flat wagon
- Well car
