= Pocket wagon =

Rail vehicle for carrying a semi-trailer

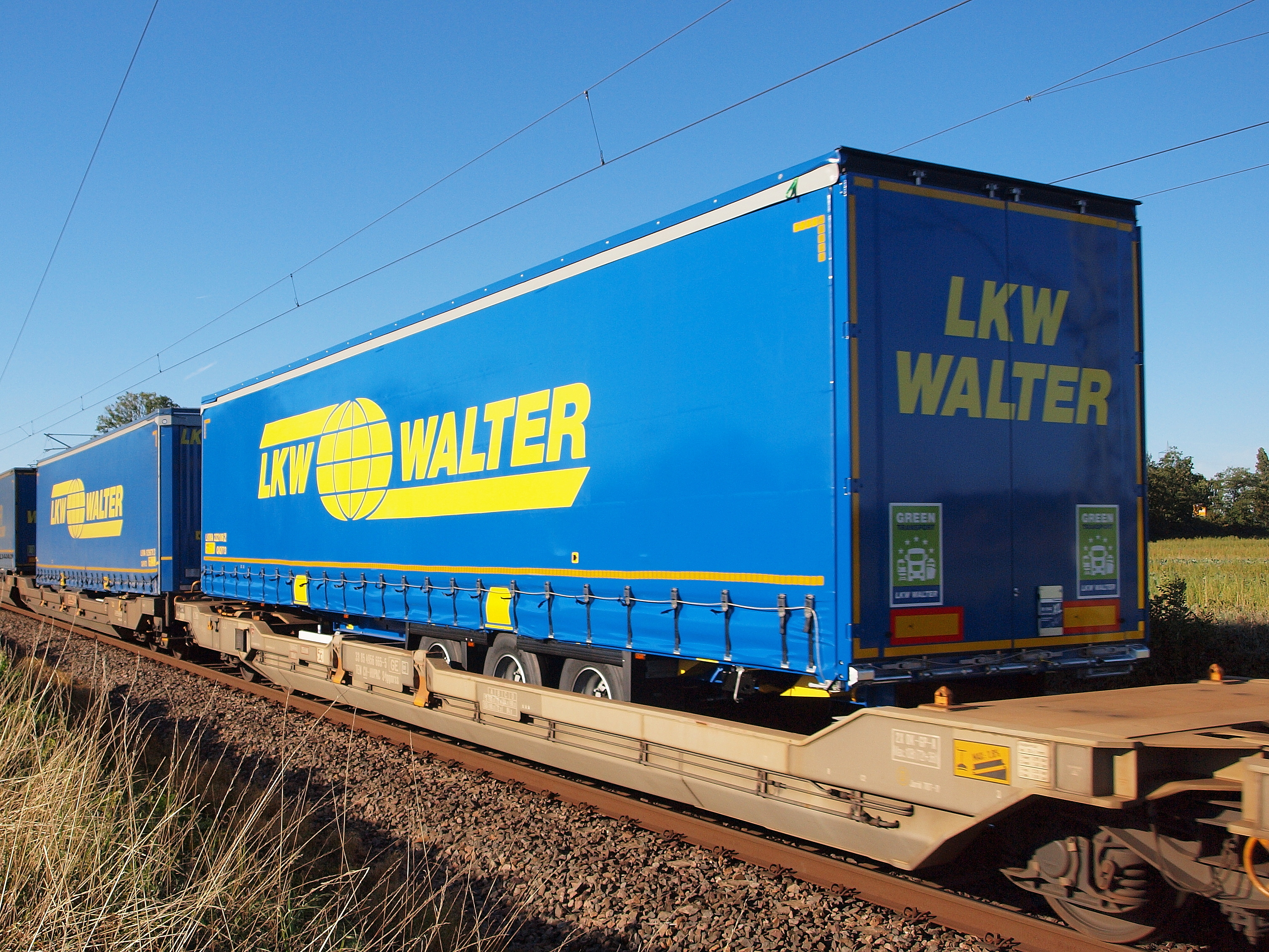
Pocket wagons loaded with curtainside semi-trailers

A pocket wagon is a freight wagon that has been specially designed for the transport of truck semi-trailers. This wagon belongs to the group of flat wagons in special design with bogies and is used in combined transport (CT). The name of these freight wagons comes from the fact that between the narrow longitudinal girders on the outside and also lengthways between the bogies, the so-called pockets are located, in which the wheels of the semi-trailers are particularly low. For flexible use in CT, pocket wagons have hinged latches with ISO spigots on the solebar, so that containers and swap bodies up to 45 ft can be accommodated. As a flat wagon, it bears the UIC generic letter S and, since it is intended for the transport of road vehicles on one level, the code letter d. Since it is also possible to transport containers in a pocket wagon, it bears the UIC generic mark Sdgs. In this context, the code letter g stands for "containers up to 60 feet" and the lower case s for the permitted speed of up to 100 km/h (62 mph). The wagons have a yellow triangle with a black P on the long side. The first pocket wagons were built in Germany as early as 1972 and further developed according to requirements.

== Structure ==
So that the loading gauge of the wagon is as small as possible, it is equipped with external side members that leave deep space for the chassis of the semi-trailer. The semi-trailer is secured with its kingpin by a coupling plate or a saddle, which are located on a support frame; some of its wheels are still wedgelocked. With regard to the service life of the king pin, loaded wagons are to be treated as caution items with 3 exclamation marks; a regulation that is also associated with a ban on kicking and walking. Container support pins are usually present on the sidebar so that it can be freely used in CT trains and so that it does not necessarily have to be reloaded with a semi-trailer on the way back. New wagons have a height-adjustable support frame, which can also be moved in the longitudinal direction of the wagon and can therefore be adapted to the different semi-trailers.

== Requirements for the semi-trailer ==
Only codified semitrailers approved for rail transport can be loaded, as loading is carried out with a crane or a mobile loading device that relies on gripping edges. The semi-trailer is lifted into the wagon, so it does not drive onto the wagon. For loading, the rear underrun protection must also be raised and, if air suspension is available, it must be vented.

== Types ==
=== T1 (Sdgkms 707) ===
The archetype of all pocket wagons was created in 1973. Of the bogie flat wagons, which were still known by the DB as Skss-z 707, a total of 700 were purchased by the Deutsche Bundesbahn, and other identical wagons from other European railway companies. The key features of these wagons are a length over buffers of 16,440 mm (53 ft 11 1/4 in) and a load limit of 33 tonnes (32 long tons; 36 short tons). In the course of time, both of these things turned out to be too small due to ever larger semi-trailers. This freight wagon, built according to UIC leaflet 571-4, received the UIC generic sign Sdkms (s) with the type number 707 from around 1980. The T2 was a longer eccentric, which was built in small numbers for the FS and was therefore not included in the T-type designations.

=== T3 (Sdgmns 743) ===
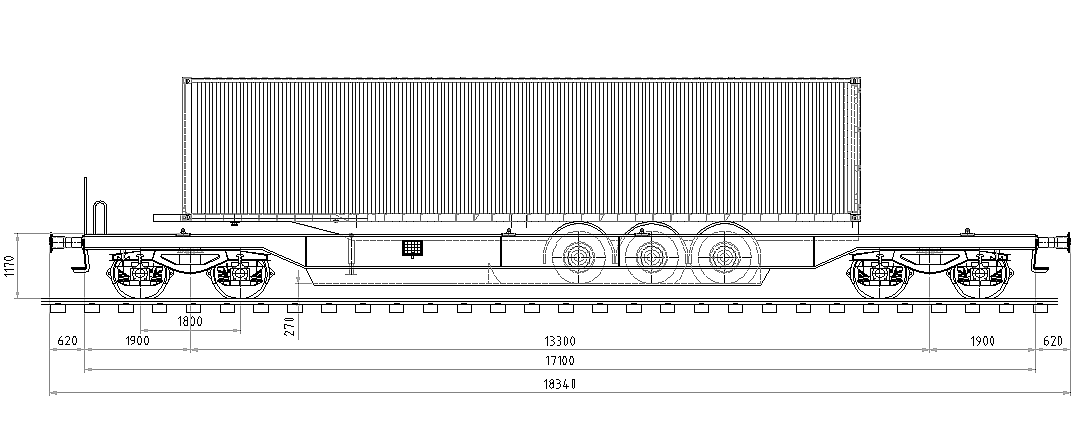
Dimensional drawing of Sdgmns ^{743} (T3) of the DB.

As a result of the too small T1, the T3 was created in the early 1990s. At 18,340 mm (60 ft 2 in), this wagon is almost 2 m (6 ft 6 3/4 in) longer and has a load limit of 69 t (68 long tons; 76 short tons), so that at least against the background of these values, every currently approved trailer can be transported. The length is not ideal for transporting containers, but is better suited for 24 ft / 26 ft swap bodies due to the higher load limit.

=== T4.0 / T4.1 / T4.2 ===
The T4.0l, developed in- house by Hupac AG, now has a loading length of 18,280 mm (59 ft 11 5/8 in), which is also common today for one-piece 60 ft container wagons. The load limit is 69 t (68 long tons; 76 short tons) for containers and 38 t (37 long tons; 42 short tons) for trailers. The T4.1 is a successor series with minor changes. The T4.2, which was also procured by WASCOSA AG, has slightly cranked solebars on the pocket part for better accessibility of the crane contact point from lower semi-trailers.

=== T5 ===
The T5 is again a Hupac further development of the T4, in which modern so-called mega - trailers with an interior height of 3 m can also be transported. These trailers require a floor that is lower above the top of the rails (TOR) and even lower longitudinal beams on the wagon frame to grip the arms on the semitrailer.

=== Sdggmrs 744 / Sdggmrs 739 ===
This wagon is an articulated wagon with three two-axle bogies. The 270 wagons built exclusively for the DB as combination wagons are partly pure 106 ? ft container wagons with a loading length of 16,100 mm (52 ft 9 7/8 in) and partly similar to the T3 pocket wagon section. The type 739 is approved for 140 km/h (87 mph), otherwise identical. The different paintwork of the container part in blue and the bag part in orange was striking, which is why the car was nicknamed "Parrot".

=== T2000 (Sdggmrss 736) ===
Another articulated wagon is the T2000, which does not have a combined container and pocket wagon half, but has two T3-like pocket wagon parts as in the "Parrot".

=== T3000 (Sdggmrss 738) / T3000 e (Sdggmrs 738.1) ===
The T3000 is a further developed articulated wagon that is also suitable for mega trailers. The wagon has rising frames at the ends of the bogie and support beams with hinged latches for containers or swap bodies that can be moved at right angles over the longitudinal girder on rollers. The T3000 e has two T5-like parts with hinged bolts in fixed central positions on the solebar, which therefore cannot accommodate a 30 ft container.

=== Gallery ===
Pocket wagons

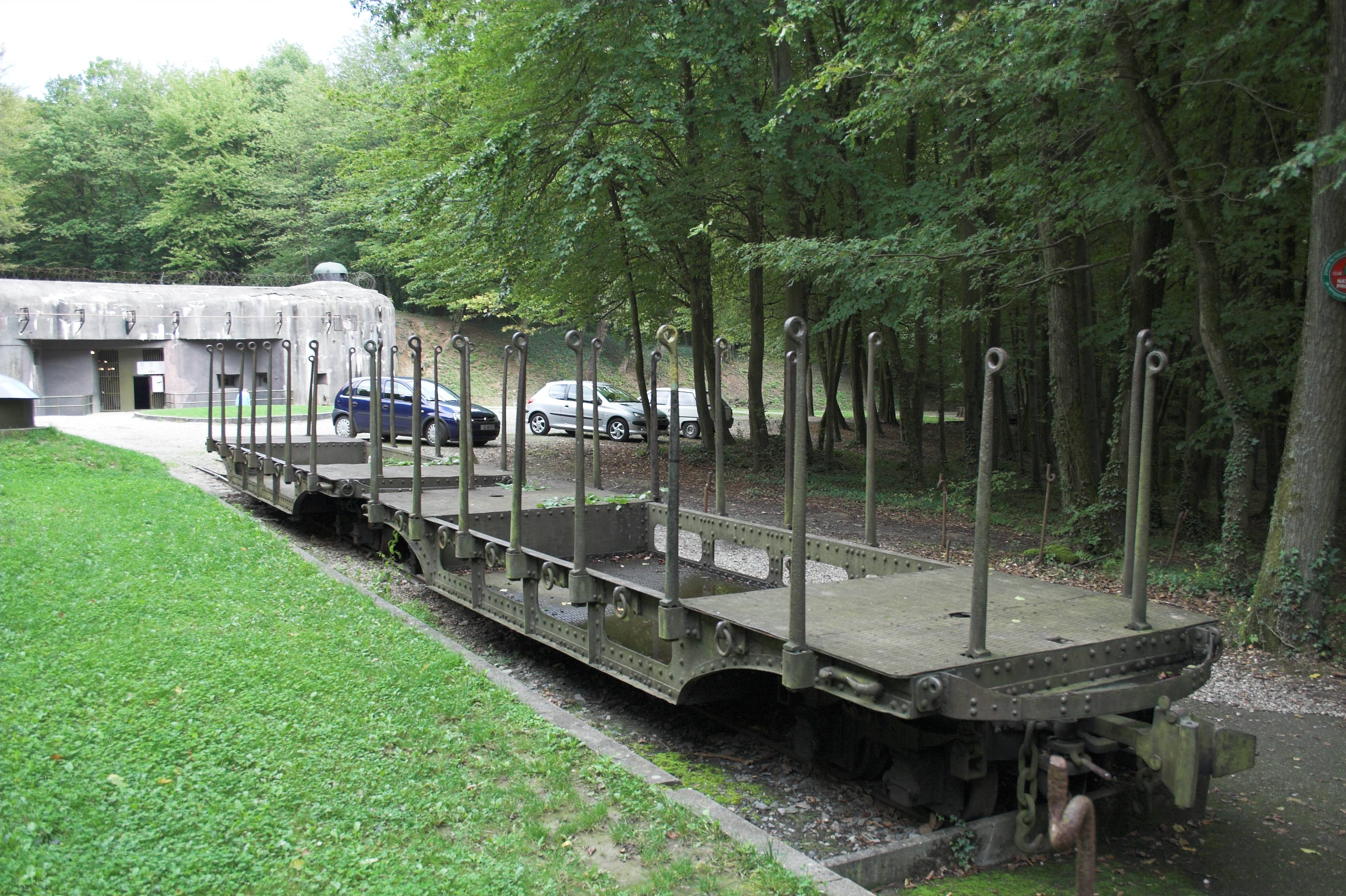
WW I trench railways pocket wagons at Fort Schoenenbourg Schoenenbourg, France

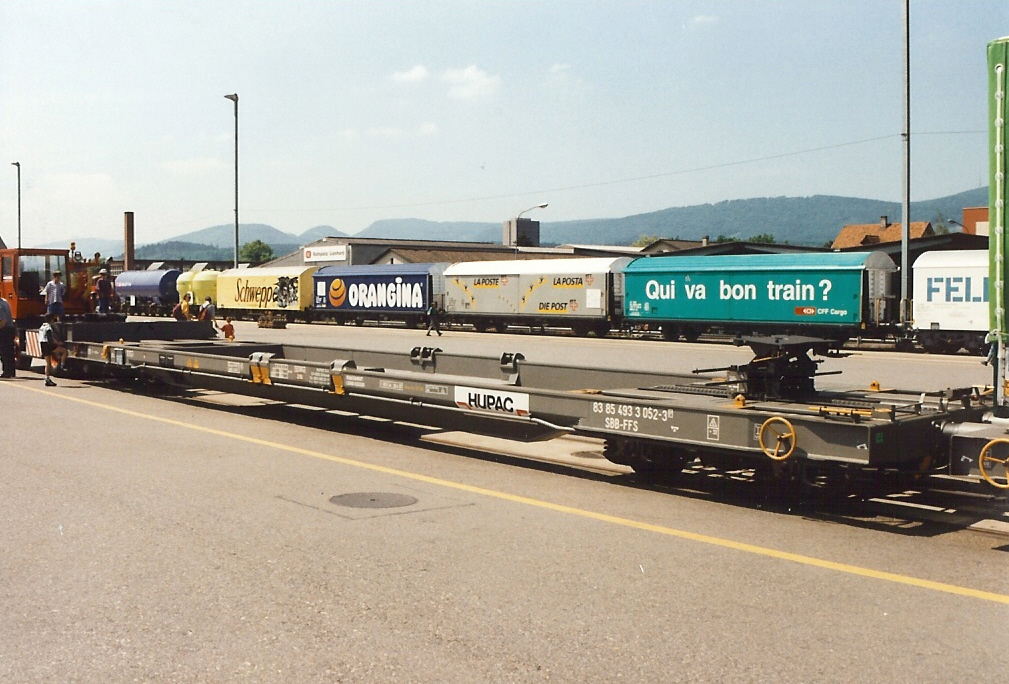
Part of the Hupac jumbo wagon that is set up to transport a semi-trailer

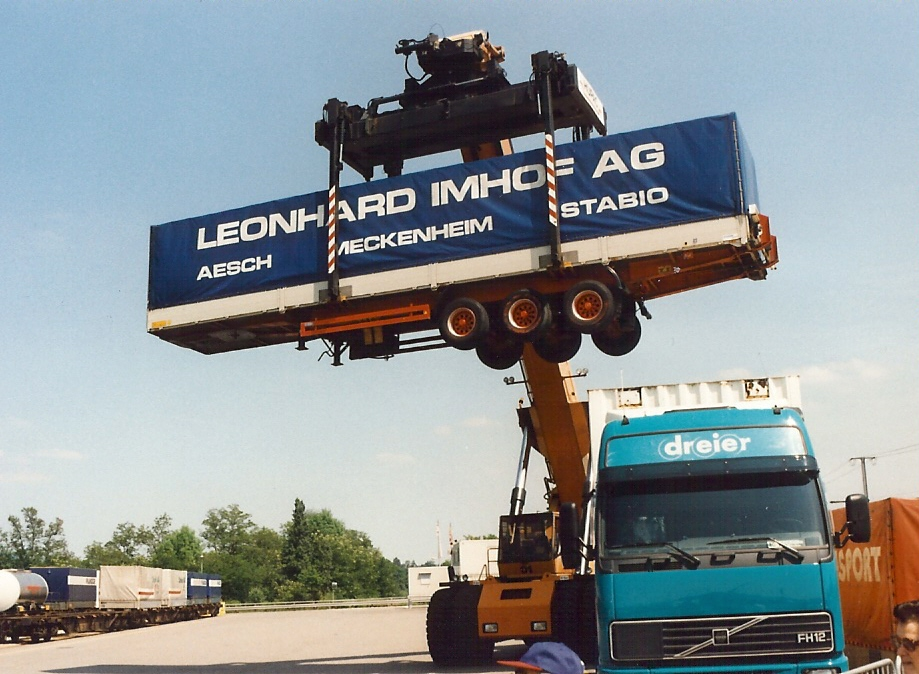
A semi-trailer lifted for loading

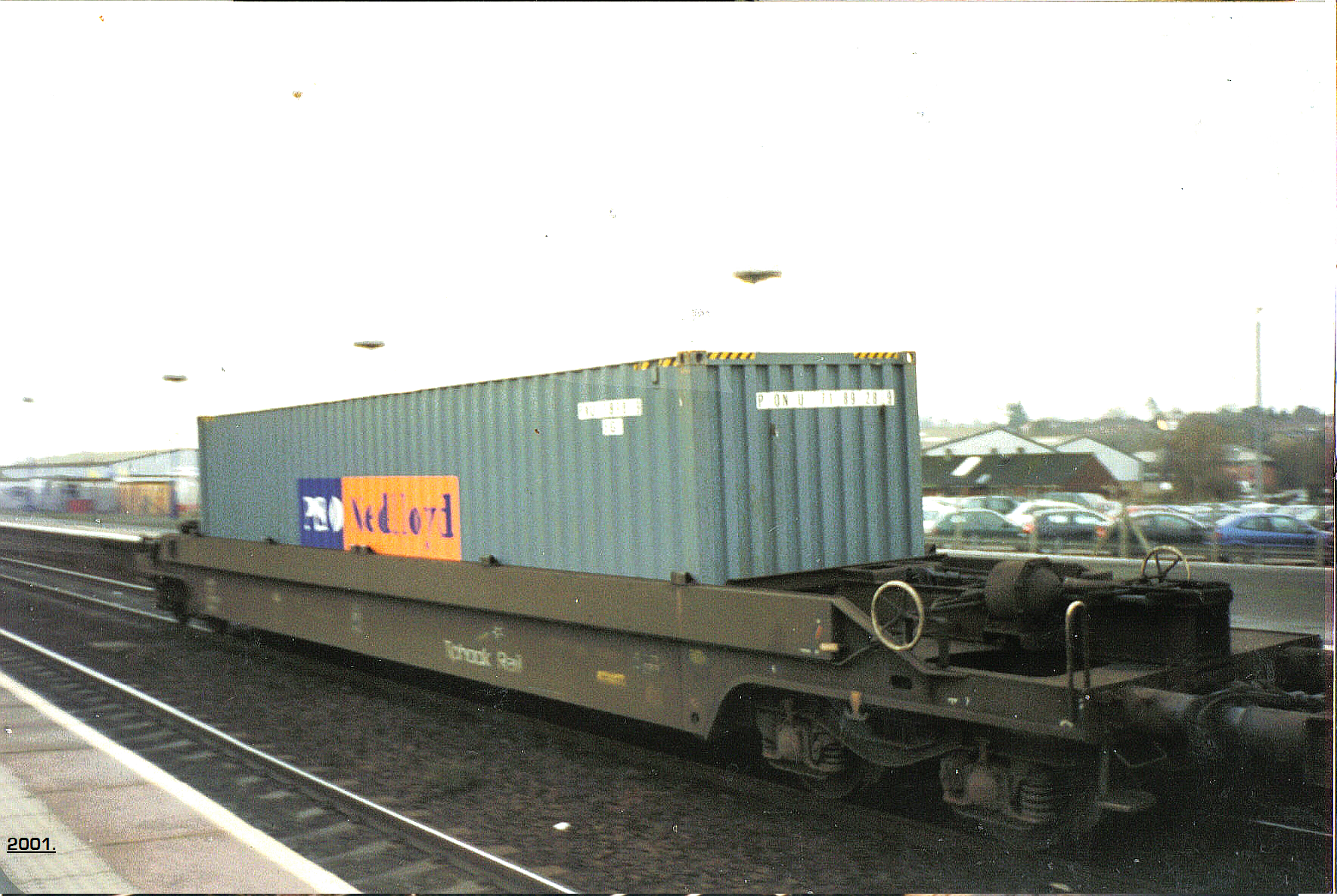
A tiphook wagon loaded with one intermodal container (double stack is not possible in the United Kingdom)

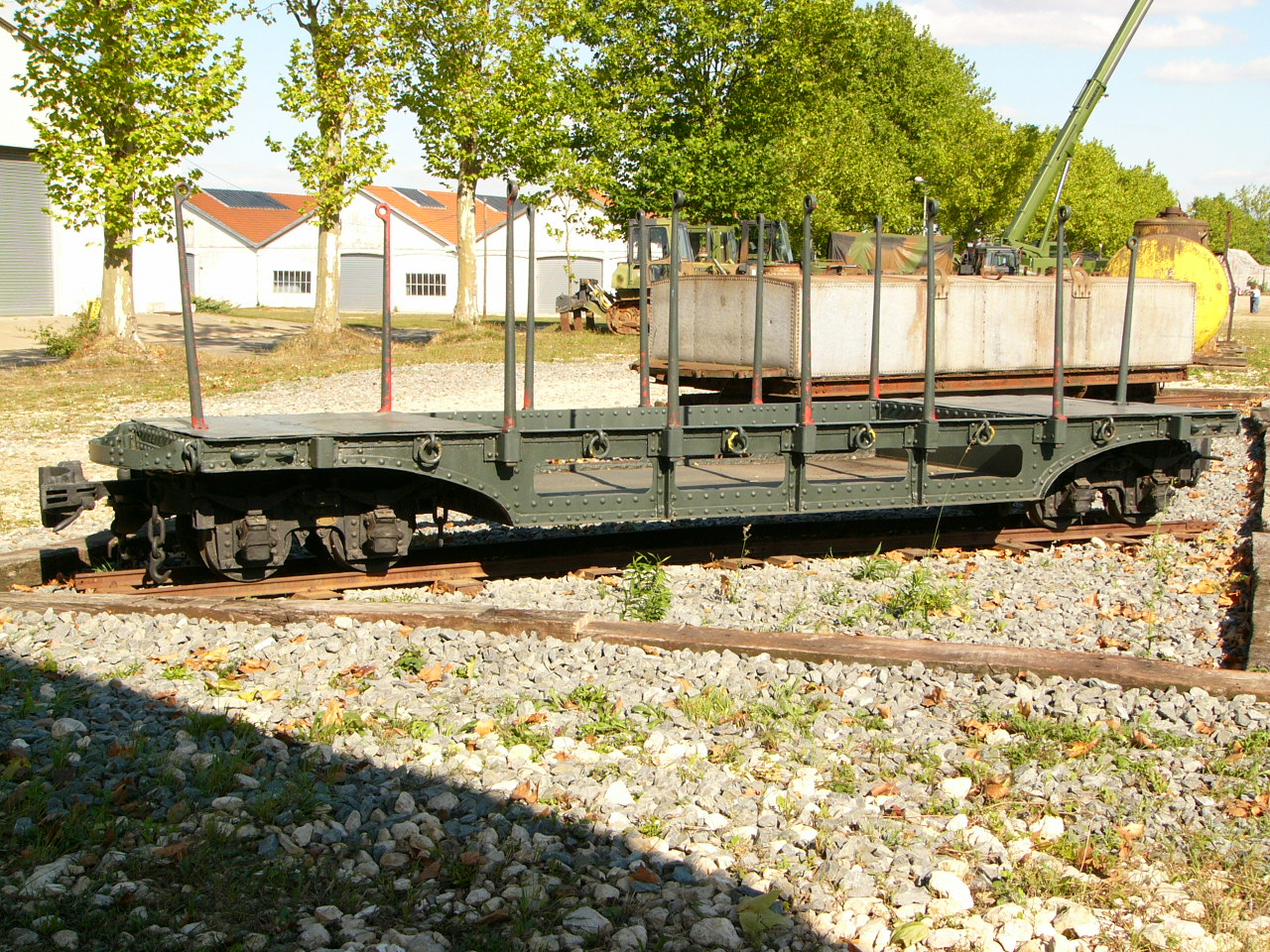
A WW I pocket wagon for transporting artillery shells. A rectangular water tank wagon is in the background.

== Incident ==
In the Great Belt Bridge rail accident, the kingpin of a semi-trailer had come loose due to wind pressure from the side and the trailer had been pushed into the clearance profile of the oncoming passenger train. Pocket wagons were temporarily banned in Denmark.

== Models ==
T1 pocket wagons for model railways have been used in H0 gauge for a long time, from Roco and Märklin, TT gauge from Tillig and N gauge from Roco and Trix. More modern and contemporary models in H0 are the T3 from Roco, the "Parrot" from Tillig, the T2000 from Roco, the Twin* from Rocky-Rail/Pullman-ESU and the T3000 e from Roco and Piko. From two smaller H0 manufacturers there was the T3 (Ade / Hobbytrade) and T4.0 / T4.1 (Kombimodell). The latter also announced other types such as T5, T2000 etc., but never delivered.

== See also ==
- Class U special wagon
- Tiphook
- Trailer-on-flatcar aka TOFC, piggyback
- Well car

== Bibliography and sources ==
- Helmut Behrends, Wolfgang Hensel, Gerhard Wiedau: Goods wagon archive. Volume 2. Transpress-Verlag, Berlin 1989, ISBN 3-344-00330-5
- Website o / u Prospecte combination model.
- Dybas (https://www.dybas.de/)
- The word pocket wagon occurs 7 times on this page
- Definition of pocket wagon
