= GE Capital Rail Services =

Former American railcar leasing company

GE Rail Services
- Type: Subsidiary
- Industry: Rail transportation
- Founded: 1986 (acquisition)
- Defunct: 2015/2016 (sale)
- Headquarters: Chicago Title and Trust Center; Chicago, USA
- Key people: CEO & President : Joe Lattanzio
- Services: Rolling stock leasing
- Parent: GE Capital
- Website: www.gecapitalrail.com

GE Capital Rail Services, also known as GE Railcar, or GE Railcar Services Corporation was a business unit of GE Capital, a division of General Electric. It was a distinct business unit from General Electric's railway locomotive manufacturer.

GE Rail Services leased-out and managed railcars (freight cars) for the North American market. Its assets encompassed all types of common freight cars, including box, flat, covered and open-top hopper (gondola), and tank cars. The company also managed the servicing and repair of freight cars.

In 2015, GE Capital announced the sale of its tank car and services business to Marmon Holdings, and the remainder of the business (other freight cars, locos) to First Union Rail.

== History ==
In 1986 GE Railcar Services Corp. acquired the assets of North American Car Corp, a former rail leasing subsidiary of Tiger International which had become insolvent in 1984; GE acquired ~35000 freight cars and 14 maintenance units in North America at a cost of $420 million.

In 1989 GE acquired the railcar leasing and management business of Brae Corporation from holding company Leucadia National for approximately $180 million, acquiring, 15000 boxcars. With the acquisition GE entered the per diem boxcar leasing business.

In 1992 GE Capital Railcar reached an agreement to lease Itel Rail Corporation's (subsidiary of Itel Corporation) railcar fleet; in 1990 Itel Rail had ~70,000 rail vehicles, approximately one third of which were boxcars, another third covered hopper cars, the remainder tank, open hopper, flat and specialty freight cars. The lease agreement was for 12 years with a purchase option - the agreement brought GE's for lease fleet to ~140,000 units. The agreement moved significant accumulated debt off Itel Corporation's balance sheet; in the late 1989s Itel Corp had expanded aggressively into the North American railcar leasing business through a number of acquisitions, as well as acquiring interests in other related logistics and transportation businesses. GE would pay rental payments of $150 million pa (GE Capital had also acquired Itels container leasing business in 1990 for over $800 million.)

In 1997 GE Railcar entered into a leasing agreement with manufacturer American Car and Foundry Company (ACF) to lease 35000 freight cars (over three quarters of its fleet), with purchase and supplementary agreements to use ACF's repair facilities.

In 2008 GE attempted to sell the business - GATX Corp offered $3 billion for the company, but the deal was not completed due to difficulties raising funds due to the Great Recession. In 2011, it was reported that GE had again placed the business up for sale - the assets were valued at $3 billion at the end of 2010. The unconfirmed sale attempt was reported as having been cancelled in July 2011.

In the late 2000s, due to a drop in rail car leasing due to the general economic recession initiated by the 2000s financial crisis GE Railcar attempted to alter the terms on a $1.2 billion contract (2007) for the acquisition of over 11000 rail cars from The Greenbrier Companies. The GE contract represented 84% of Greenbrier's ongoing railcar orders, and any reduction in the order volume was expected to cause job and revenue losses in addition to those already caused by the recession and the production slowdown for the GE order. On 15 December 2009 GE and Greenbrier reached a modified contract agreement in which Greenbrier would manufacturer up to 6000 units for GE. As terms of the contract, Greenbrier gained the right of first refusal to manufacture any GE railcar order placed up to December 2018, and a similar right to any vehicle refurbishment up to 2015. Greenbrier also obtained a maintenance co-partner agreement for GE's rail rolling stock over a 5-year period. The resultant contract gave Greenbrier an order book of at least, 4900 units valued at $430 million plus an option for a further 2200 cars. The renegotiated contract represented approximately 40% of the North American freight car industry backlog.

On 30 September 2015 GE Capital announced the sale of its rail services division: Marmon Holdings (Berkshire Hathaway) acquired most of the businesses tank car fleet, and was to acquire the servicing activities in late 2015 - the business was to be managed by Union Tank Car Company and Procor; the remainder of the GE rail fleet, comprising c.77000 freight cars and 1000 locomotives was to be sold to First Union Rail (Wells Fargo), closed in January 2016. The total value of the sale to GE was $1.3 billion on a $4.0 billion net investment.

== See also ==
- GE Transportation Systems
- List of rolling-stock leasing companies
