= YMB (disambiguation) =

The Yellow Moon Band, often abbreviated as YMB, are an English rock band.

YMB may also refer to:

- Yambes language, the ISO 639 code ymb
- Merritt Airport, the IATA code YMB
- Bogie Flat Wagon, the TOPS code YMB

== See also ==
- YMB Saya Tin, a Burmese composer
