= Iron ore car =

An iron ore car can be

- A gondola car
- An open wagon
- A hopper car
