= Weißer Schöps/Neiße =

- Verwaltungsverband
- Location of Weißer Schöps/Neiße within Görlitz district
- Interactive map of Weißer Schöps/Neiße
- Location within Germany Location within Saxony
- Coordinates: 51°15′N 14°53′E
- Country: Germany
- State: Saxony
- District: Görlitz
- Seat: Kodersdorf
- Subdivisions: 4 municipalities

Area
  - Total: 150.65 km^{2} (58.17 sq mi)

Population (2025-12-31)
  - Total: 7,645
  - Density: 50.75/km^{2} (131.4/sq mi)
- Time zone: UTC+01:00 (CET)
  - Summer (DST): UTC+02:00 (CEST)
- Website: www.weisserschoeps-neisse.de

Weißer Schöps/Neiße is a Verwaltungsverband in the district of Görlitz in Saxony, Germany. The seat of the Verwaltungsverband is in Kodersdorf.

The Verwaltungsverband Weißer Schöps/Neiße consists of the following municipalities:

- Horka
- Kodersdorf
- Neißeaue
- Schöpstal
