= Neißeaue =

- Municipality
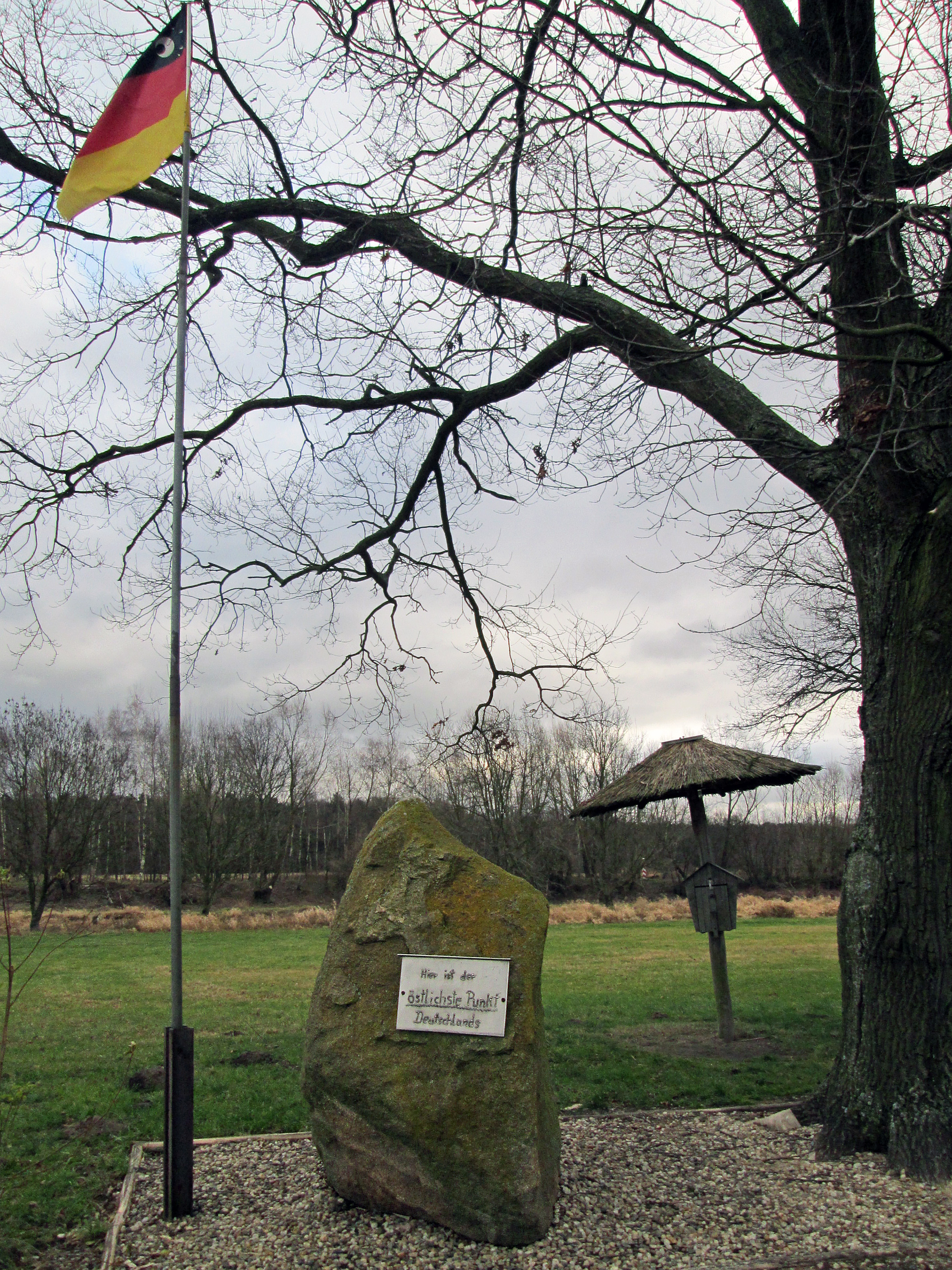
- Easternmost point in Germany

- Coat of arms

- Location of Neißeaue within Görlitz district
- Interactive map of Neißeaue
- Location within Germany Location within Saxony
- Coordinates: 51°14′50″N 14°58′30″E
- Country: Germany
- State: Saxony
- District: Görlitz
- Municipal assoc.: Weißer Schöps/Neiße
- Subdivisions: 8

Government
  - Mayor (2020–27): Per Wiesner

Area
  - Total: 47.29 km^{2} (18.26 sq mi)
- Elevation: 170 m (560 ft)

Population (2025-12-31)
  - Total: 1,608
  - Density: 34.00/km^{2} (88.07/sq mi)
- Time zone: UTC+01:00 (CET)
  - Summer (DST): UTC+02:00 (CEST)
- Postal codes: 02829
- Dialling codes: 035820
- Vehicle registration: GR, LÖB, NOL, NY, WSW, ZI
- Website: www.neisseaue.de

Neißeaue (Upper Sorbian: Nysowa łučina, pronounced [ˈnɨsɔwa ˈwutʃina]) is a municipality in the district Görlitz, Saxony, Germany. It was formed in 1995, uniting Deschka, Emmerichswalde, Groß Krauscha (seat of administration), Kaltwasser, Klein Krauscha, Neu Krauscha, Zentendorf and Zodel. The easternmost point in Germany lies within its municipal limits, including Zentendorf, the easternmost settlement in Germany.
