= Zentendorf =

- Ortsteil of Neißeaue
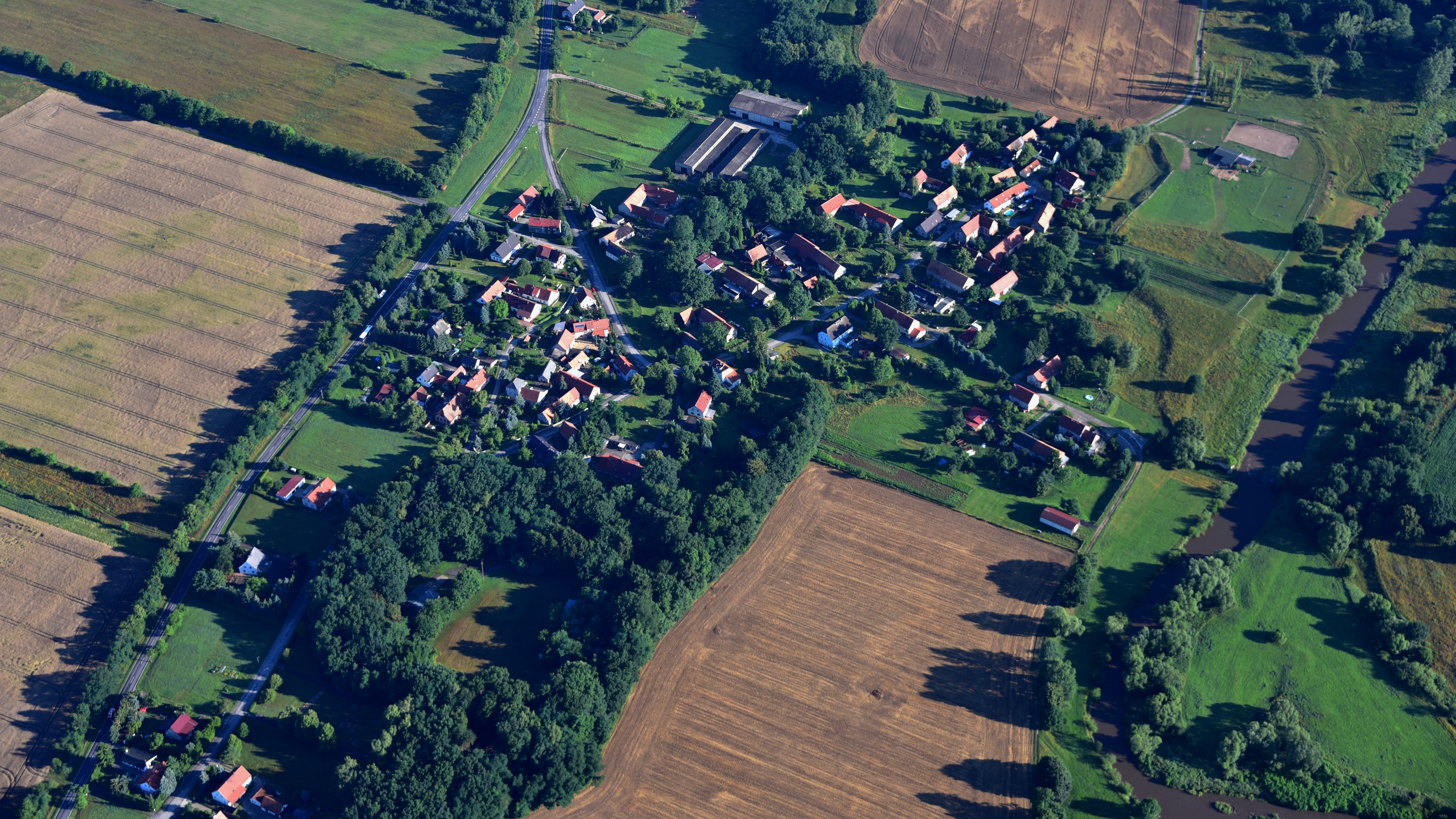
- Interactive map of Zentendorf
- Location within Germany Location within Saxony
- Coordinates: 51°16′44″N 15°1′46″E
- Country: Germany
- State: Saxony
- District: Görlitz
- Municipality: Neißeaue

Population (2021)
  - Total: 145
- Time zone: UTC+01:00 (CET)
  - Summer (DST): UTC+02:00 (CEST)

Zentendorf (Upper Sorbian: Šćeńc, pronounced [ˈʃtʃɛnʲts]) is a village (Ortsteil) of Neißeaue, in the district Görlitz, Saxony, Germany. Prior to its incorporation into Neißeaue on 1 January 1999, Zentendorf was part of the municipality of Deschka and until 1 July 1950, it was an independent municipality. Zentendorf is the easternmost place in Saxony and Germany.

== History ==
The small village of Zentendorf was first mentioned in 1390 under the name of Cenetindorf. A wide variety of place names have been mentioned for the place in the further course of time. In 1427, it was called Czenthendorf and in 1533 Zenttendorff; in 1560 the place name Centendorf was recorded. In 1791, Zentendorf was first mentioned under its current name. The place name is derived from the Sorbian term for "young dog".

After the border changes following World War II, in which all German territory east of the Oder was annexed to Poland and the Soviet Union, Zentendorf became the easternmost point of East Germany, and thereafter, modern-day Germany. From German unification in 1871 until World War II, the title was held by the village of Schirwindt, in East Prussia, which is now in Russia.
