= Kodersdorf =

- Municipality
- Location of Kodersdorf within Görlitz district
- Interactive map of Kodersdorf
- Location within Germany Location within Saxony
- Coordinates: 51°14′37″N 14°53′20″E
- Country: Germany
- State: Saxony
- District: Görlitz
- Municipal assoc.: Weißer Schöps/Neiße
- Subdivisions: 3

Government
  - Mayor (2022–29): René Schöne (CDU)

Area
  - Total: 42.27 km^{2} (16.32 sq mi)
- Elevation: 328 m (1,076 ft)

Population (2025-12-31)
  - Total: 2,237
  - Density: 52.92/km^{2} (137.1/sq mi)
- Time zone: UTC+01:00 (CET)
  - Summer (DST): UTC+02:00 (CEST)
- Postal codes: 02923
- Dialling codes: 035825
- Vehicle registration: GR, LÖB, NOL, NY, WSW, ZI
- Website: www.kodersdorf.de

Kodersdorf (Upper Sorbian: Kodrecy, pronounced [ˈkɔdʁɛtsɨ]) is a municipality in the district Görlitz, Saxony, Germany. It is known by the motorway junction with the German motorway A 4.
