= Horka, Saxony =

Horka
- Municipality
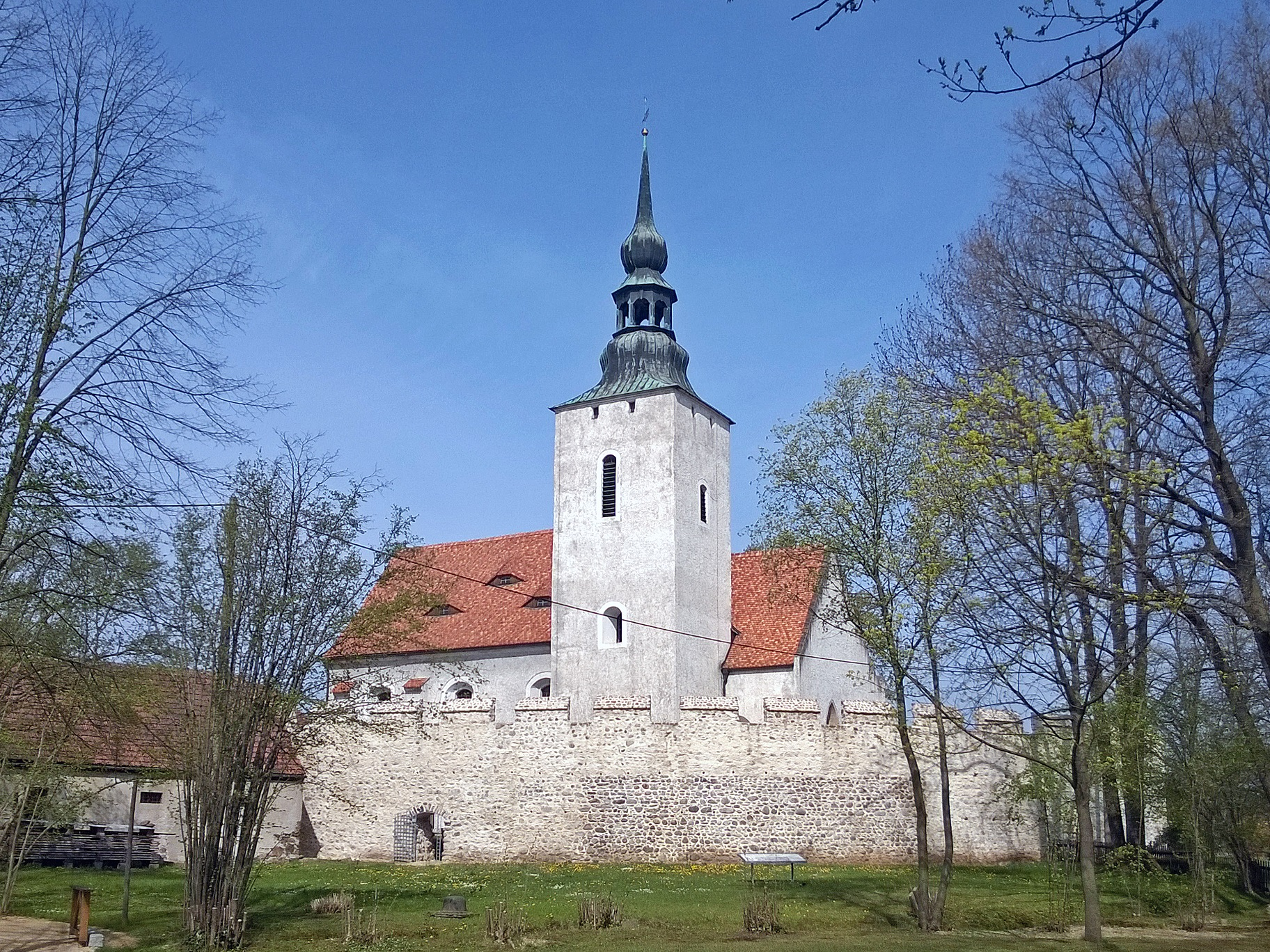
- Protestant fortified church in Horka

- Coat of arms

- Location of Horka within Görlitz district
- Interactive map of Horka
- Location within Germany Location within Saxony
- Coordinates: 51°18′N 14°54′E
- Country: Germany
- State: Saxony
- District: Görlitz
- Municipal assoc.: Weißer Schöps/Neiße
- Subdivisions: 3

Government
  - Mayor (2022–29): Christoph Biele (CDU)

Area
  - Total: 40.79 km^{2} (15.75 sq mi)
- Elevation: 164 m (538 ft)

Population (2025-12-31)
  - Total: 1,542
  - Density: 37.80/km^{2} (97.91/sq mi)
- Time zone: UTC+01:00 (CET)
  - Summer (DST): UTC+02:00 (CEST)
- Postal codes: 02923
- Dialling codes: 035892
- Vehicle registration: GR, LÖB, NOL, NY, WSW, ZI
- Website: www.horka.de

Horka (Upper Sorbian: Hórka, pronounced [ˈhʊʁka]) is a municipality in the district Görlitz, Saxony, in eastern Germany, close to the border with Poland.

== History ==
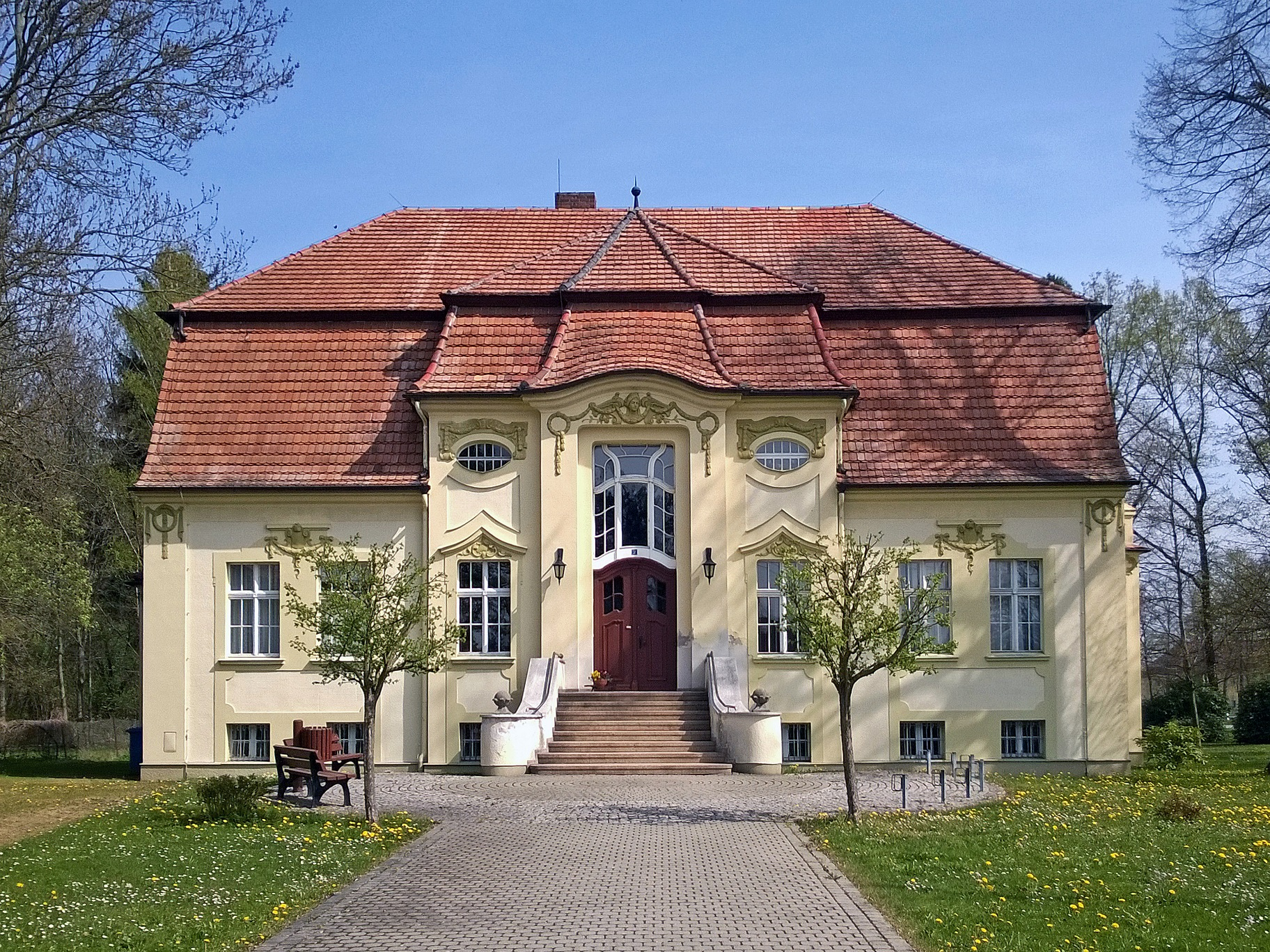
Manor house, which now houses the municipal administration

The village was mentioned in 1305. In 1319, it became a part of the Duchy of Jawor, the southwesternmost duchy of fragmented Piast-ruled Poland. In the following decades, it passed to the Czech (Bohemian) Crown Lands. In 1469 it passed to Hungary, and in 1490 it returned to the Czech Crown, then under the rule of Polish Prince Vladislaus II. From 1635, it was ruled by Electors of Saxony, from 1697 also Kings of Poland. In 1815, it fell to Prussia, and from 1871 it was part of the German Empire. In 1907, a rail connection to Rothenburg and Przewóz was opened.

In 1936, the Nazi government renamed the village to Wehrkirch to erase traces of Sorbian origin. During World War II, on April 26, 1945, the Germans carried out a massacre of a field hospital column of the 9th Polish Armored Division, killing some 300 POWs, mostly wounded soldiers and medical personnel (the Horka massacre).

After the war, the village was part of East Germany. In 1947, its historic name was restored. In 1988, a rail accident occurred near Horka that killed five East German and three Polish citizens.
