= Open wagon =

Railway wagons for transportation of bulk goods

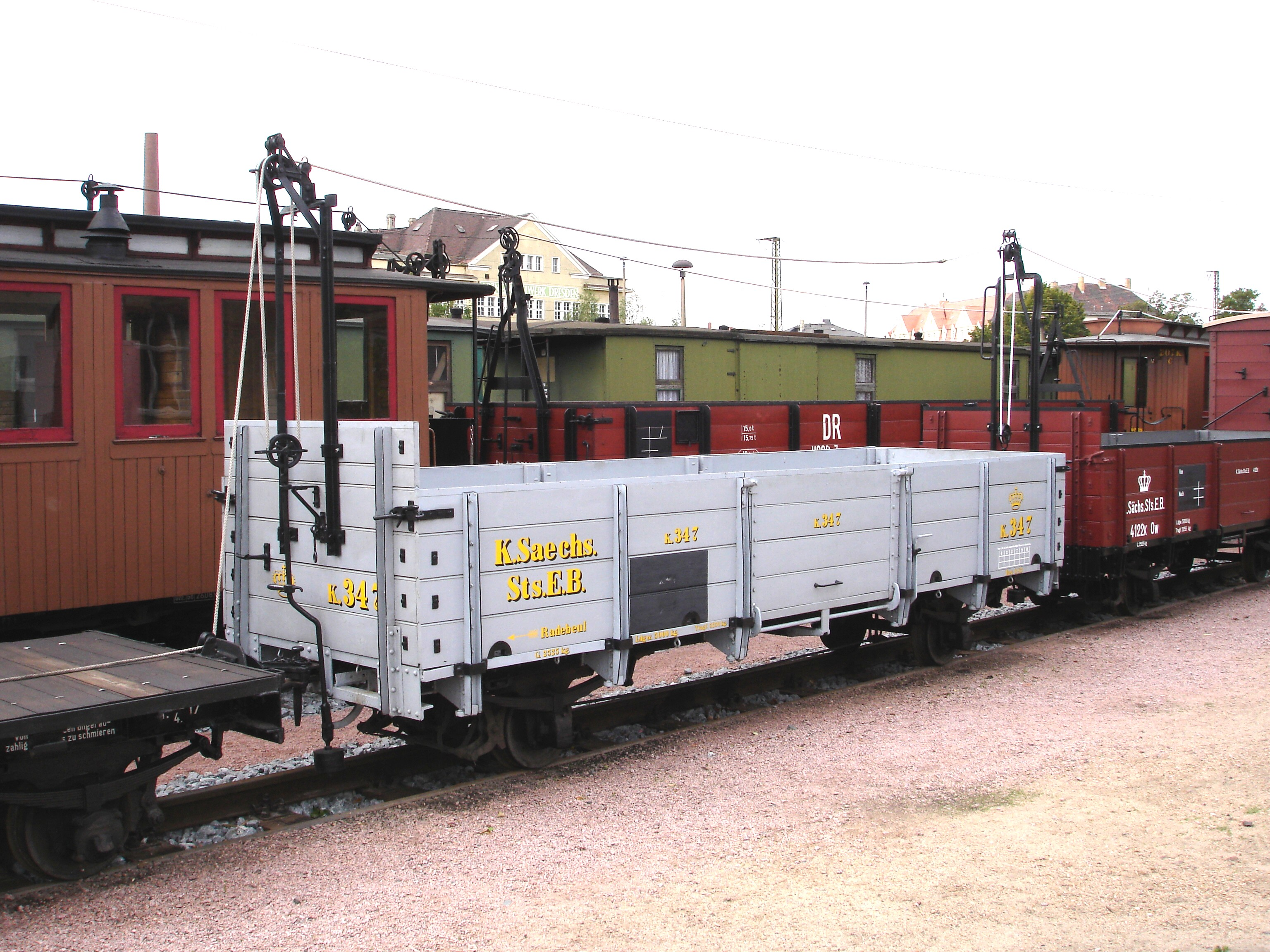
A Class Ow goods wagon on the Saxon narrow gauge railways with Heberlein brakes

Open wagon for peat, 750 mm (2 ft 5 1/2 in)

An open wagon (or truck in the UK) forms a large group of railway goods wagons designed primarily for the transportation of bulk goods that are not moisture-retentive and can usually be tipped, dumped or shovelled. The International Union of Railways (UIC) distinguishes between ordinary wagons (Class E/UIC-type 5) and special wagons (F/6). Open wagons often form a significant part of a railway company's goods wagon fleet; for example, forming just under 40% of the Deutsche Bahn's total goods wagon stock in Germany.

== UIC standard goods wagons ==
Since the 1960s, the majority of goods wagons procured by European railway administrations have been built to standards laid down by, or based on, those established by the UIC. In addition to open wagons the table also shows wagons with opening roofs (Class T), whose design is based on open wagons.

Examples of standard open wagons

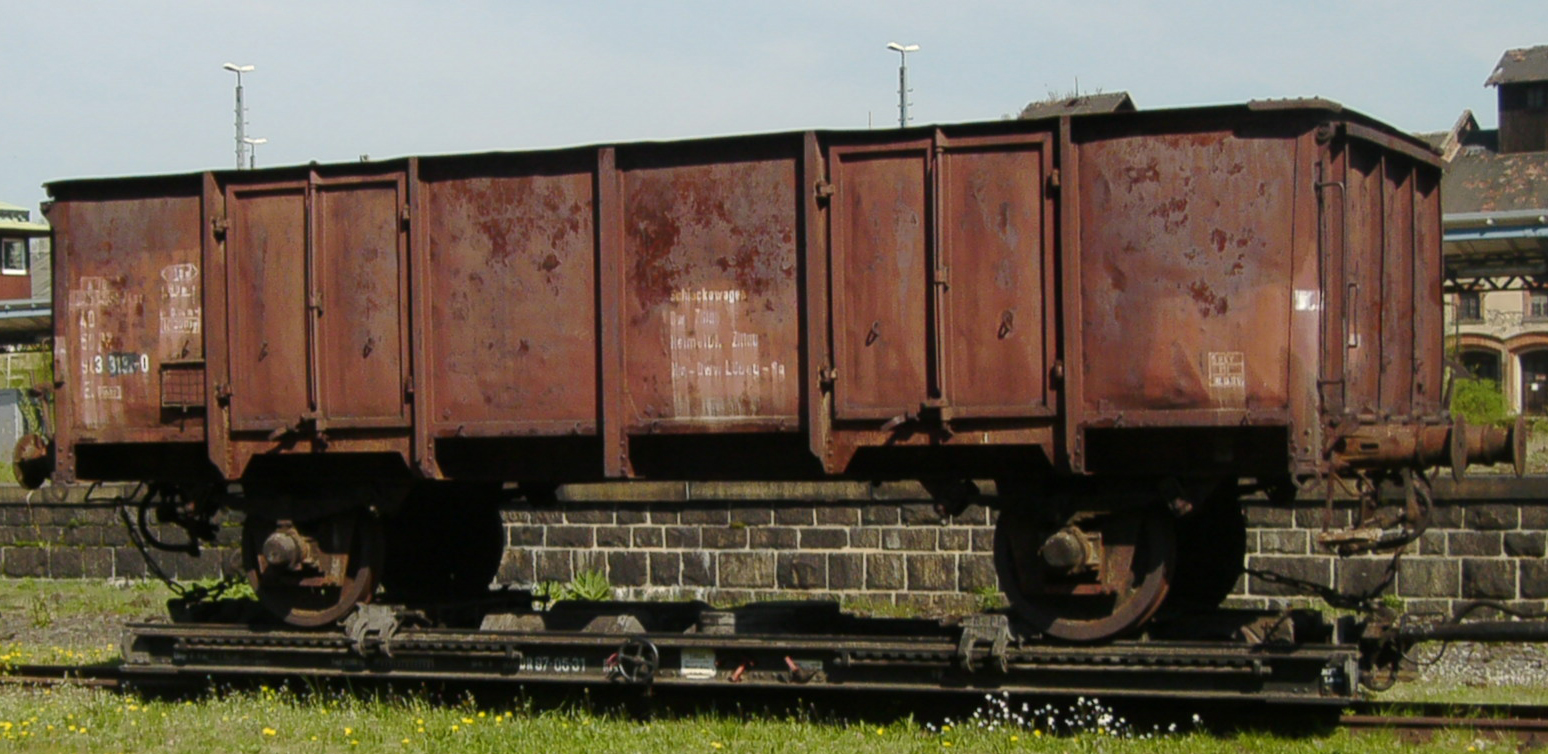
Twin-axled UIC Type 1 open wagon, used as an ash wagon, on a transporter wagon in Zittau

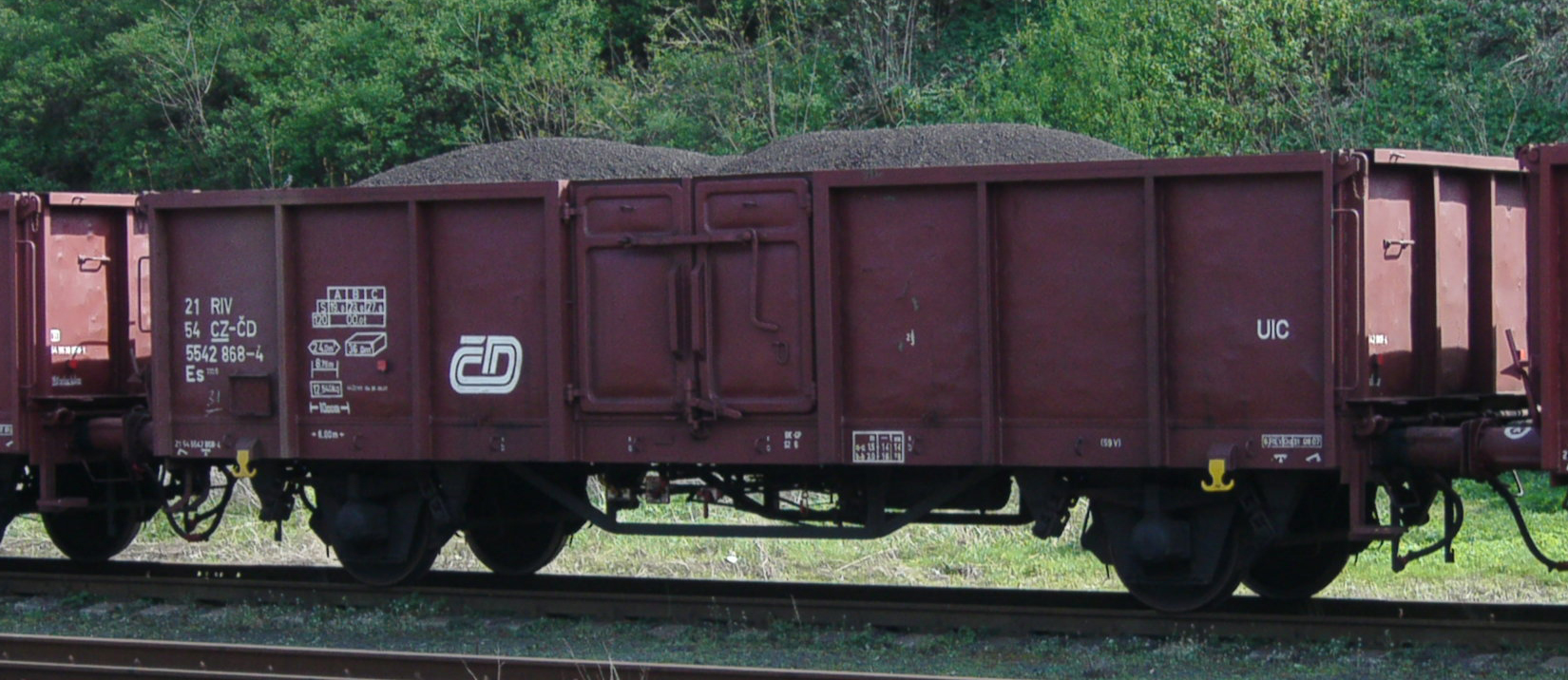
A Czech (ČD) twin-axled open wagon of UIC Type 2 in Raspenava

Norm	UIC 571-1: Ordinary class two axles		UIC 571-2: Ordinary class four axles	UIC 571-3: Special class				
Class	Type 1 "French"	Type 2 "German"		Wagon with sliding roof four axles	Hopper wagon two axles		Saddle-bottomed wagon four axles	
Class	Type 1 "French"	Type 2 "German"		Wagon with sliding roof four axles	without roof	with roof	without roof	with roof
Class	Es		Ea(o)s	Taems to 1979: Taes	Fcs	Tds	Fals	Tals
Axle base	4.85 m (15 ft 11 in)	5.40 m (17 ft 8 5/8 in)	−		6.00 m (19 ft 8 1/4 in)		−	
Bogie pivot pitch	−		9.00 m (29 ft 6 3/8 in)		−		7.50 m (24 ft 7 1/4 in)	
Length over buffers	9.04 m (29 ft 7 7/8 in)	10.00 m (32 ft 9 3/4 in)	14.04 m (46 ft 3/4 in)		9.64 m (31 ft 7 1/2 in)		12.54 m (41 ft 1 3/4 in)	
Loading length, min.	7.79 m (25 ft 6 3/4 in)	8.76 m (28 ft 8 7/8 in)	12.71 m (41 ft 8 3/8 in)	12.40 m (40 ft 8 1/4 in)	−		−	
Loading area, ca.	22 m^{2} (240 sq ft)	24 m^{2} (260 sq ft)	35 m^{2} (380 sq ft)	33 m^{2} (360 sq ft)	−		−	
Loading volume, ca.	36 m^{3} (1,300 cu ft)	36 m^{3} (1,300 cu ft)	71 m^{3} (2,500 cu ft)	74 m^{3} (2,600 cu ft)	40 m^{3} (1,400 cu ft)	38 m^{3} (1,300 cu ft)	75 m^{3} (2,600 cu ft)	72 m^{3} (2,500 cu ft)
Unladen weight, max.	...	12.5 t (12.3 long tons; 13.8 short tons)	22.0 t (21.7 long tons; 24.3 short tons)	24.0 t (23.6 long tons; 26.5 short tons)	13.0 t (12.8 long tons; 14.3 short tons)	13.5 t (13.3 long tons; 14.9 short tons)	15.0 t (14.8 long tons; 16.5 short tons)	15.5 t (15.3 long tons; 17.1 short tons)
Doors per side	2	1	2	1	−		−	
Door width	...	1.80 m (5 ft 10 7/8 in)	1.80 m (5 ft 10 7/8 in)	4.00 m (13 ft 1 1/2 in)	−		−	

== Class E – Ordinary open high-sided wagons ==
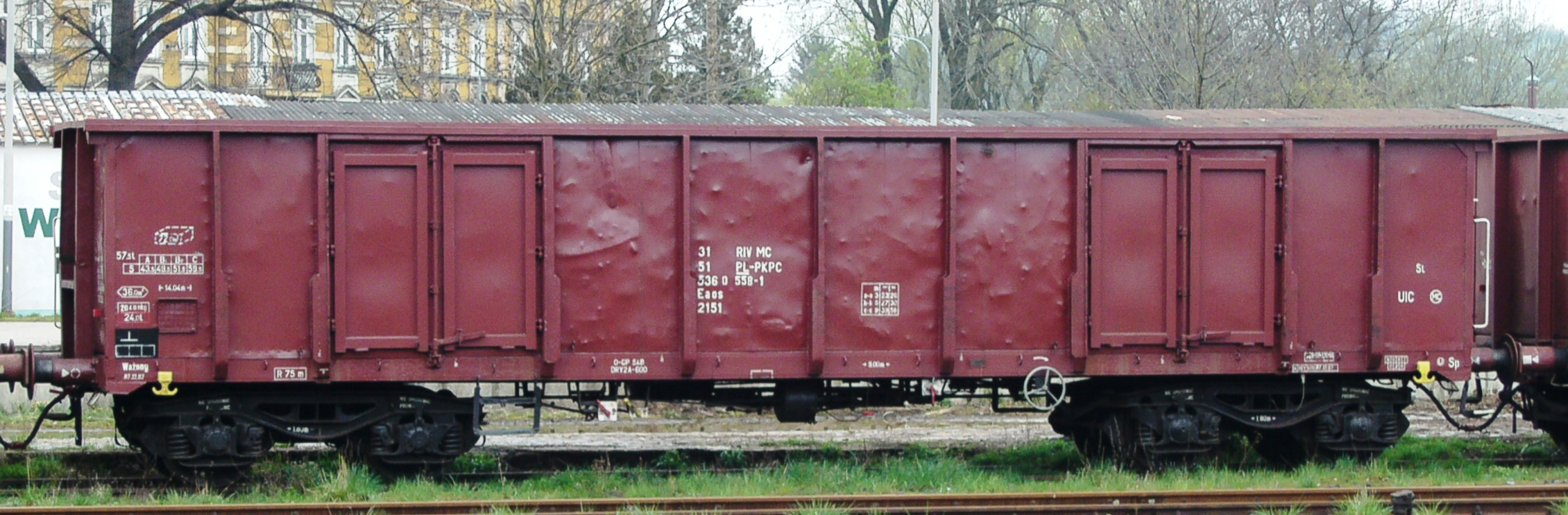
Eaos: A Polish (PKP), four-axle, ordinary, open wagon with 9.00 m bogie pivot pitch in Lubań

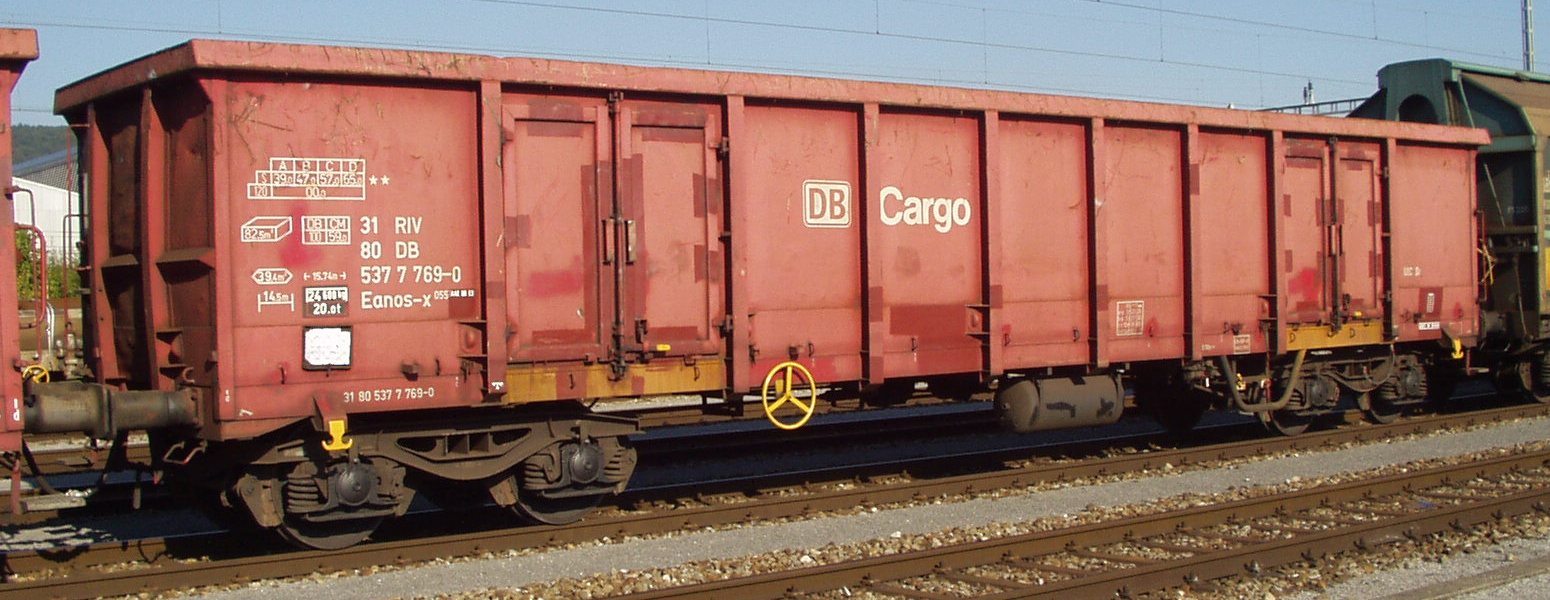
Eanos-x^{055}:A longer, four-axle, ordinary, open wagon with steel floor and 10.70 m bogie pivot pitch

These wagons have a level floor and solid sides with at least one door on each side. They are mainly used for transporting bulk goods, coal, scrap, steel, wood and paper. The majority of wagons have folding sides and end walls, otherwise they are given the letters l (fixed sides) or o (fixed end walls). Wagons may have one or two folding end walls. Steel rings enable ropes, nets or covers to be attached to secure the load.

Some of these wagons can also be completely tipped over, in other words, at certain places they can be lifted up and emptied by being turned about their longitudinal axis. This requires a very robust underframe. Sometimes the wagons are fitted with rotatable couplings so that they do not have to be individually uncoupled.

In 1998, the Deutsche Bahn (DB) had about 16,000 four-axle Class E wagons. They have increasingly retired their twin-axled E wagons since the 1990s and they are now rarely seen.

== Class F – Special open high-sided wagons ==
The majority of these are self-discharging wagons which use gravity-unloading (hopper cars and saddle-bottomed wagons), but in addition there are also:

- Side-tipping wagons (box tip, trough-tip or side-tip wagon),
- Bucket wagon, other open wagons without side doors

In addition to hopper and saddle-bottomed wagons there were also wagons with opening roofs.

Typical loads for these wagons are all sorts of bulk goods, like coal, coke, ore, sand or gravel. Because bulk goods are often moved in large quantities, these wagons are frequently used in so-called unit or block trains that only comprise one type of wagon and only shift one type of product from the dispatcher to the recipient.

=== Hopper wagons ===
Hopper wagons can only be unloaded by gravity with no external assistance and are therefore also classed as self-discharging wagons. The majority may be filled, when at rail or road level, by high-level discharge chutes (whose ends are more than 70 cm above the top of the rails) or conveyor belts. Because a controlled amount of the load can be discharged at any place the wagons may be sent anywhere and are even used individually. Railway companies also use hoppers as departmental wagons in maintenance of way trains for ballasting the track.

Since the 1990s there has been a trend for new hopper wagons to be built as bogie wagons which have not yet been standardized by the UIC.

==== Gallery ====
Examples of hopper wagons

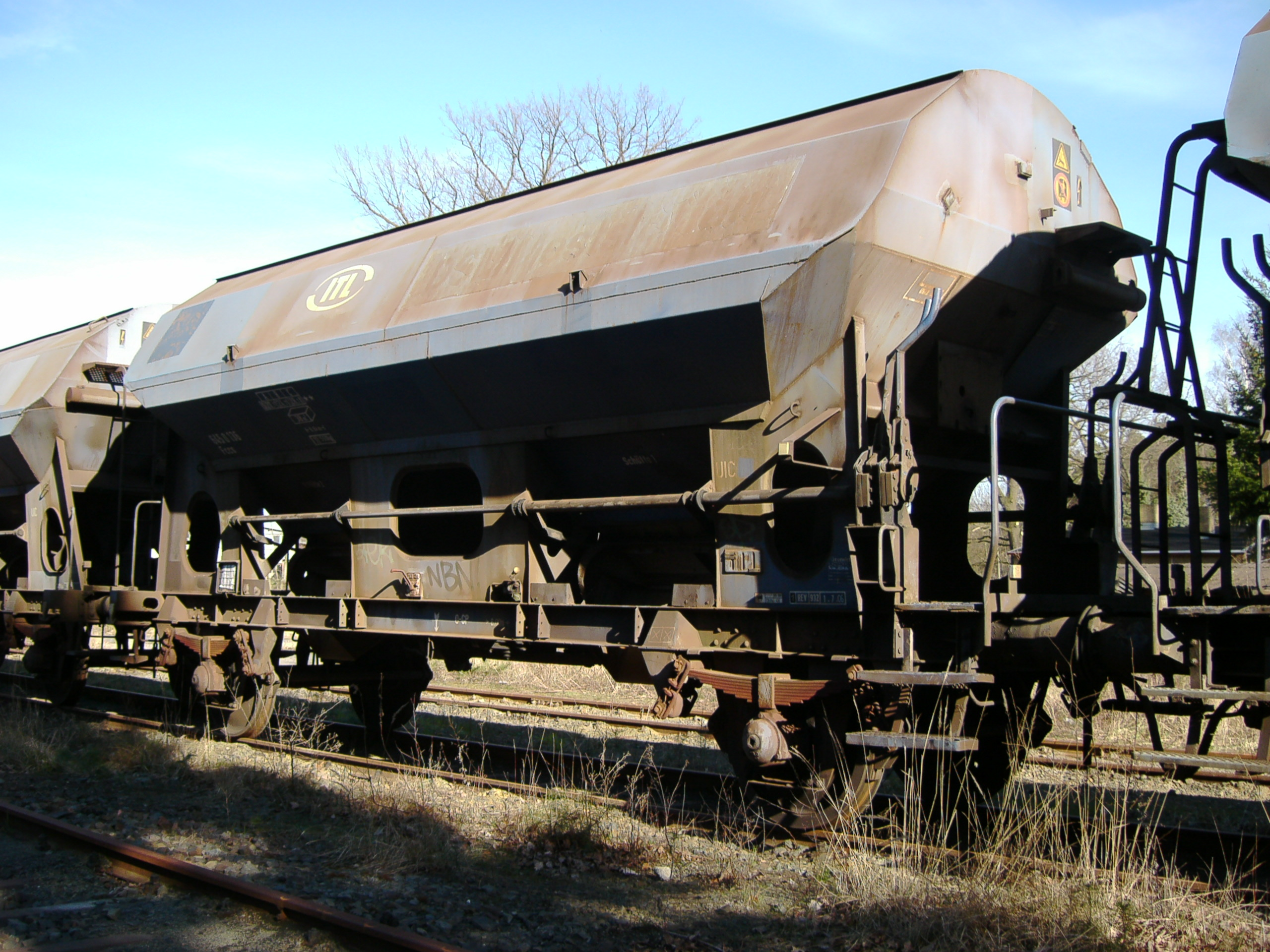
Fccs hopper of the ITL railways

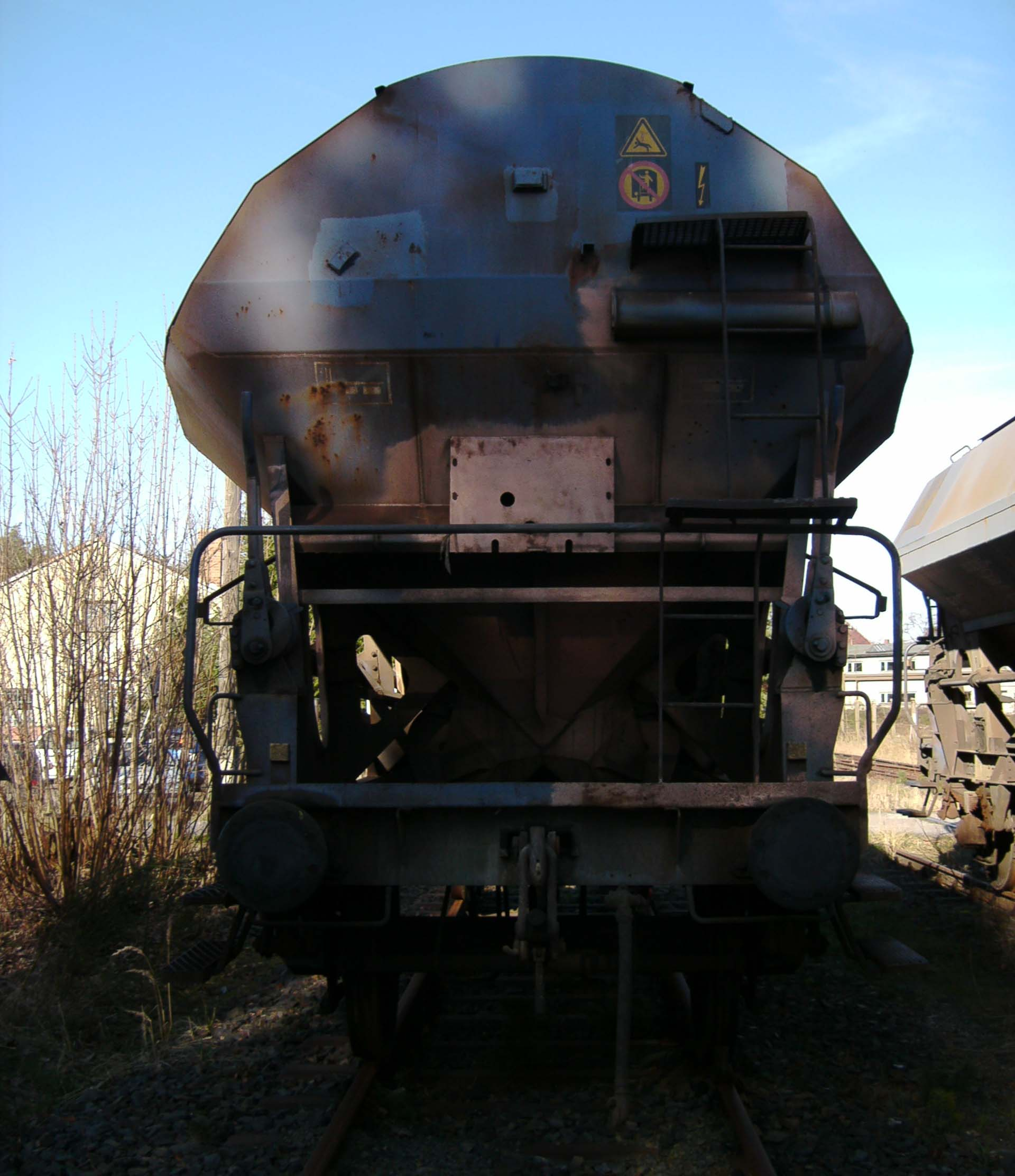
Funnel-shaped wagon floor

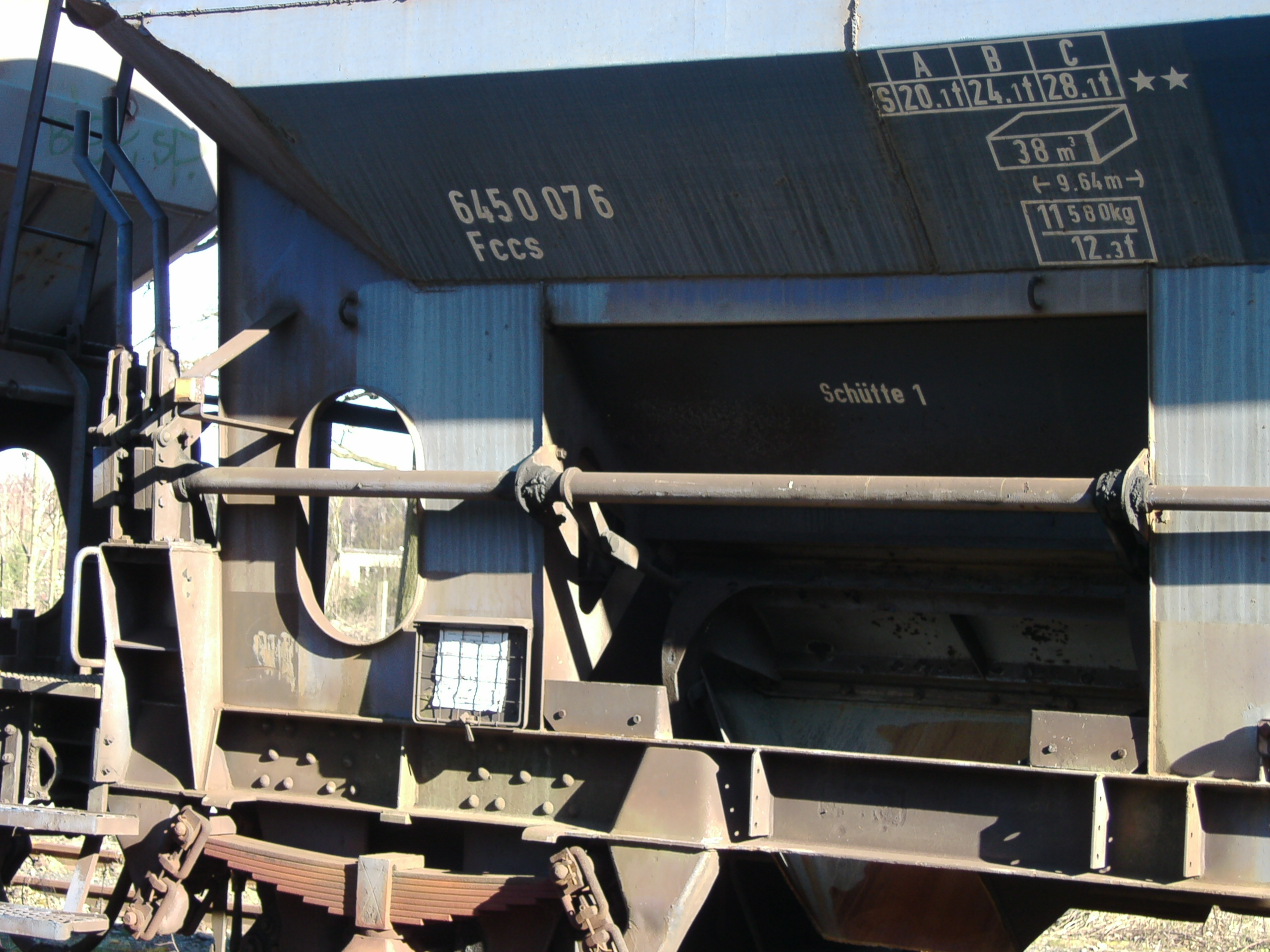
Controllable discharge equipment

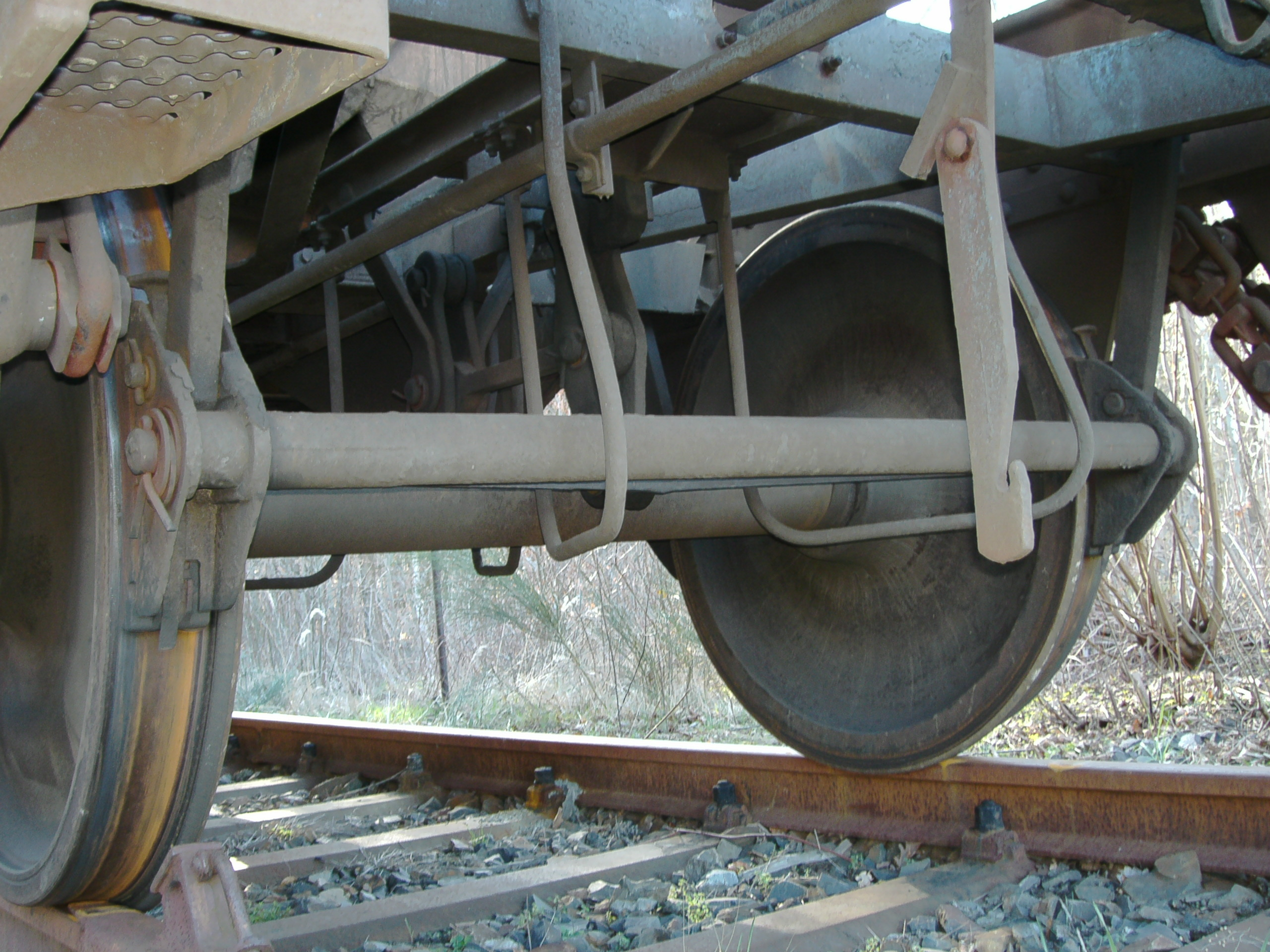
Wheelset and brake rods

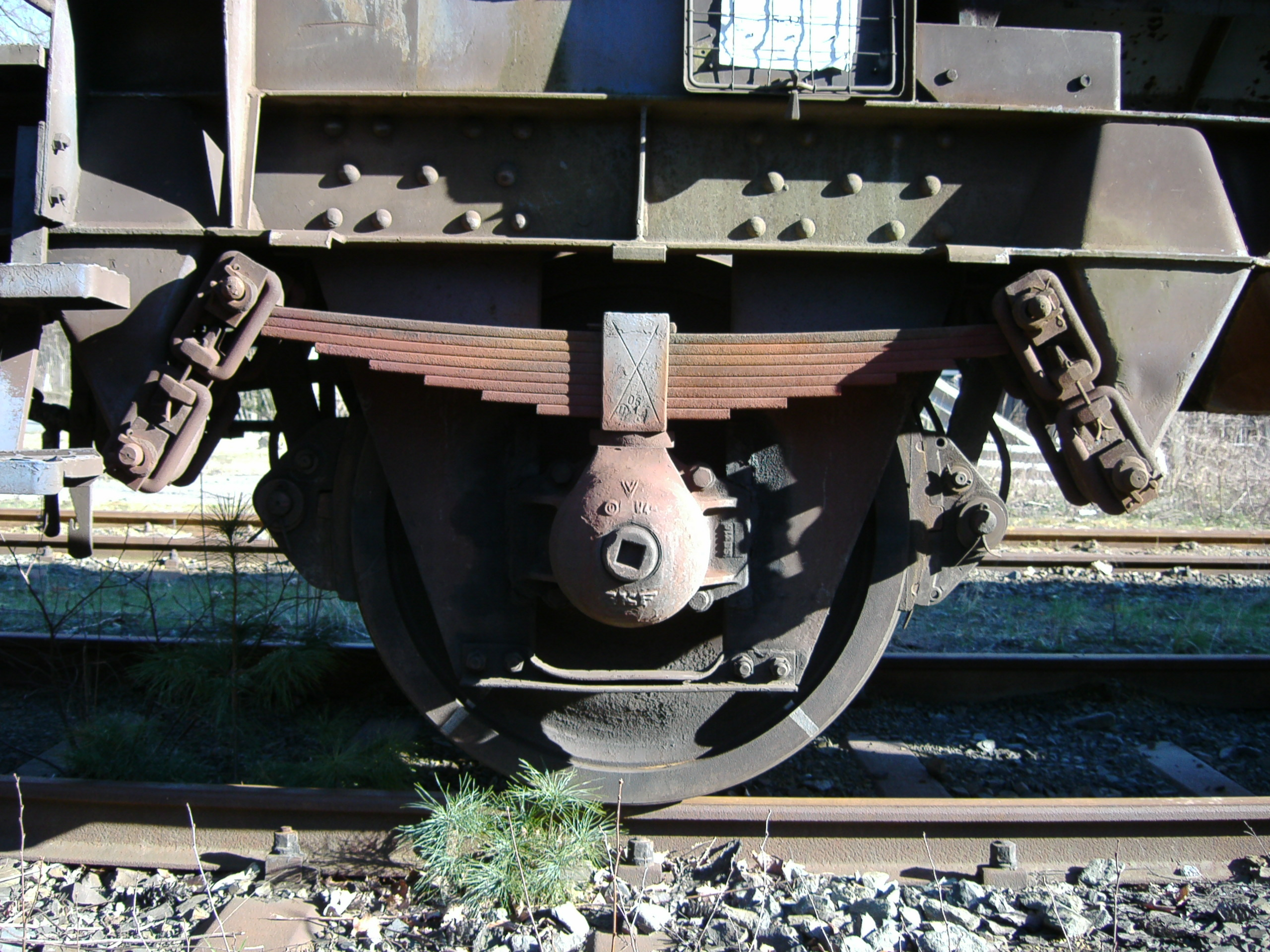
Axleboxes and double-shackle running gear

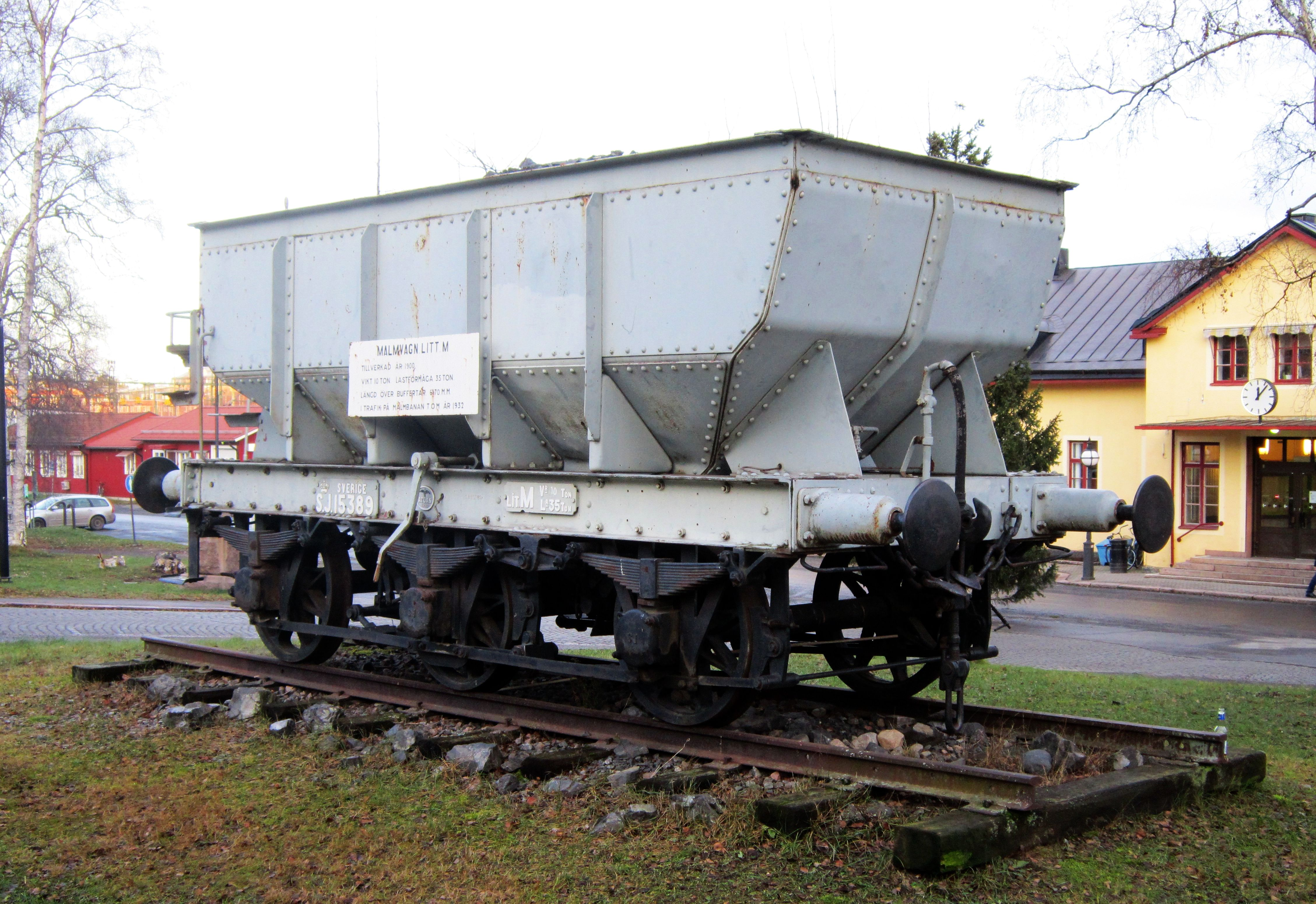
Swedish iron ore hopper (mineral wagon), built in 1900

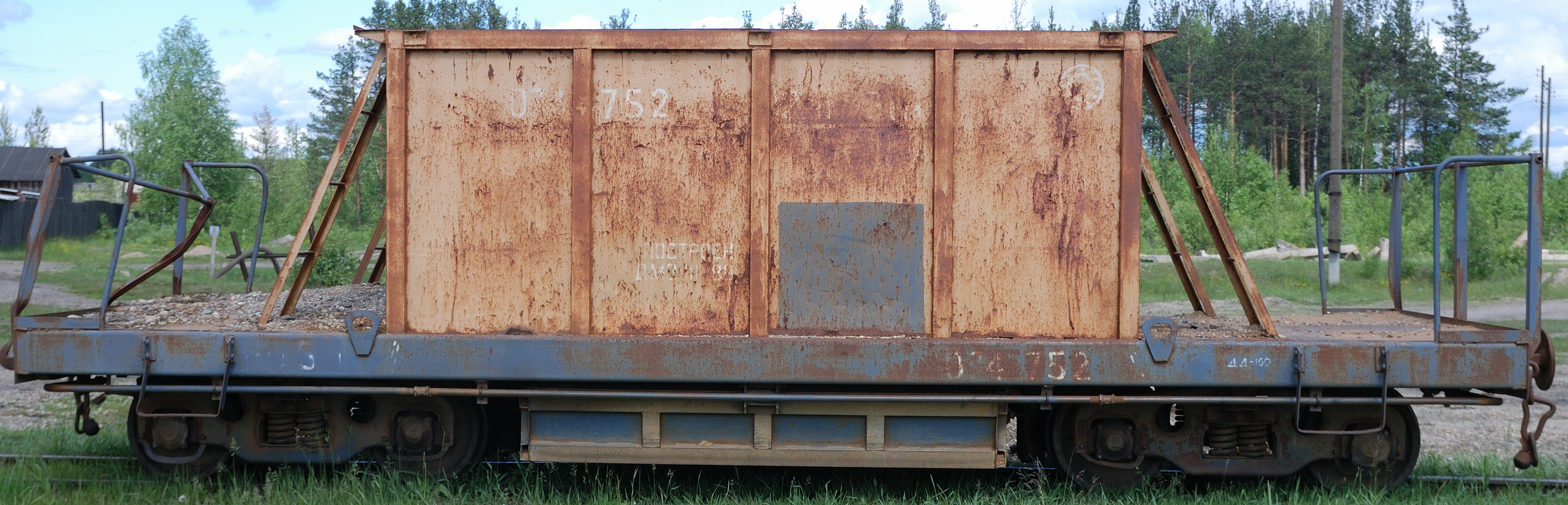
Kambarka Engineering Works hopper car to transport track ballast, 750 mm (2 ft 5 1/2 in) gauge

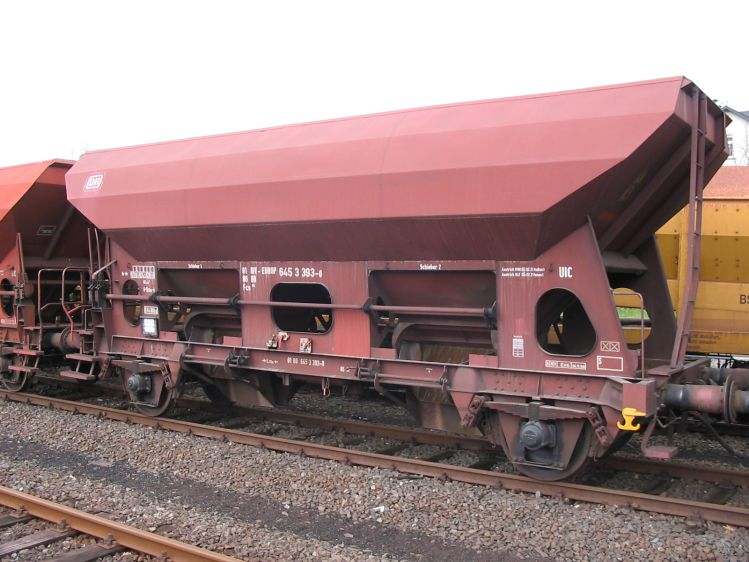
Fcs^{092}:Open wagon with controllable self-discharge equipment and high chute (hopper wagon)

=== Saddle-bottomed wagons ===
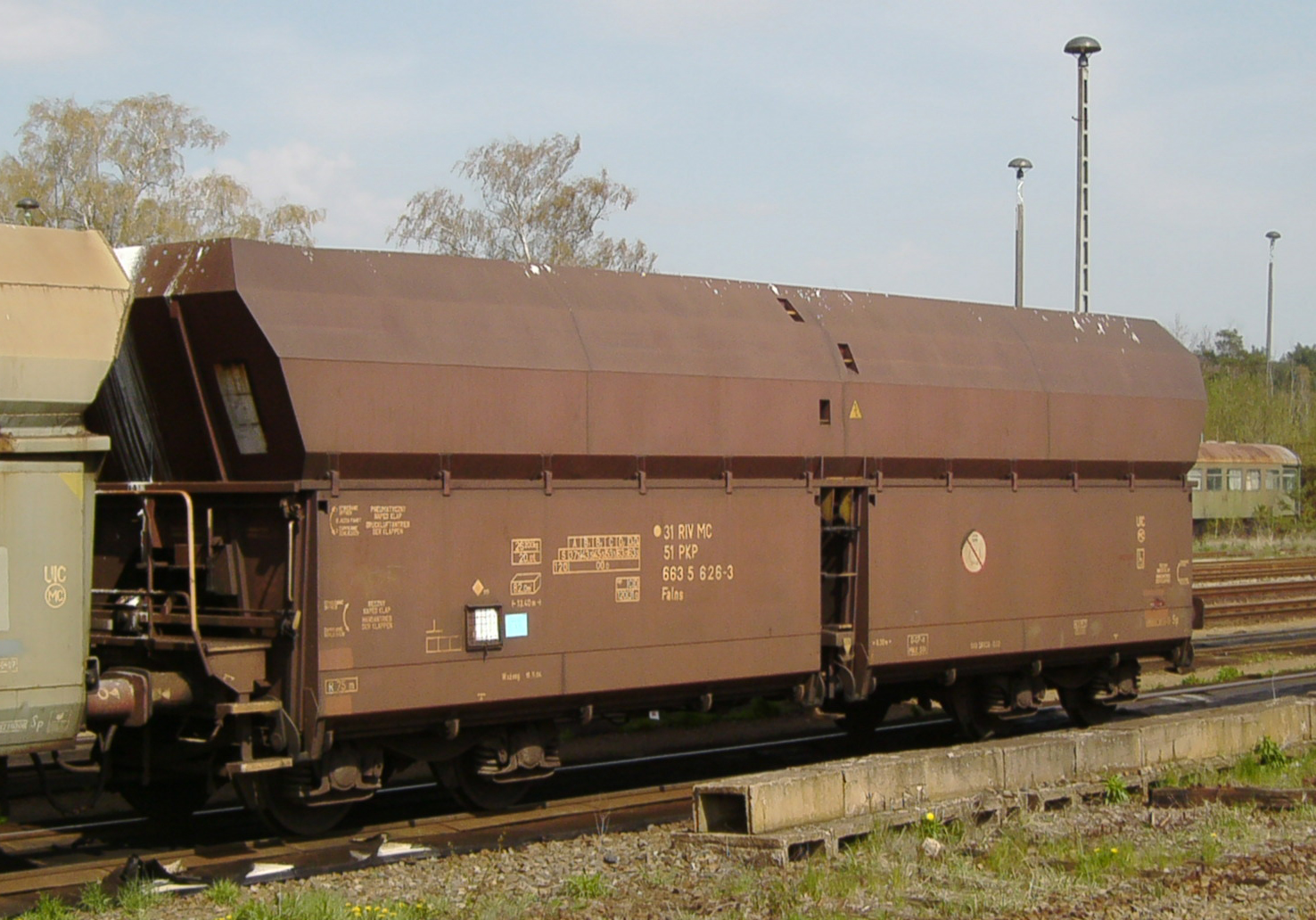
A Polish (PKP) Falns saddle-bottom wagon – a four-axle, open wagon with high-level gravity discharge to both sides and loading volume of 82 m^{3} (107 cu yd) – in Horka

Saddle-bottomed wagons are large-volume hoppers are exclusively unloaded by gravity and are therefore classed as self-discharging hoppers. Unlike normal hopper wagons, however, their discharge cannot be controlled and the entire load must be dropped. To unload the flaps on the side swing out allowing the load to empty. This is aided by the floor which slopes downwards on both sides like a gable roof. The discharging chutes on either side are relatively high up. These wagons are frequently seen in unit trains for transporting bulk goods such as coal or mineral ore from mines or ports to steelworks or power stations.

The most modern type of four axle saddle-bottomed wagon in the DB is the four axle Falns 121 with a loading volume of 90 m^{3} (120 cu yd). It was built from 1992 in several batches. By February 2008 another 100 of these wagons were to have been delivered to the DB and another 300 by 2010. These latest wagons will have an axle load of 23.5 t (23.1 long tons; 25.9 short tons) and an unladen weight of no more than 24.5 t (24.1 long tons; 27.0 short tons), resulting in a load limit of 69.5 t (68.4 long tons; 76.6 short tons).

=== Side-tipping wagons ===
Side-tipping wagons have hydraulic, pneumatic or electric tipping equipment, that enables the wagon body to be lifted on one side. Depending on the design, they may be tipped to both sides or just one side only. In order to prevent wagons from falling over during the tipping operation, some are equipped with track pinch bars with which they can be securely anchored to the trackbed. These wagons are often seen in unit trains being used to remove excavated material from major construction sites.

Example of side-tipping wagons

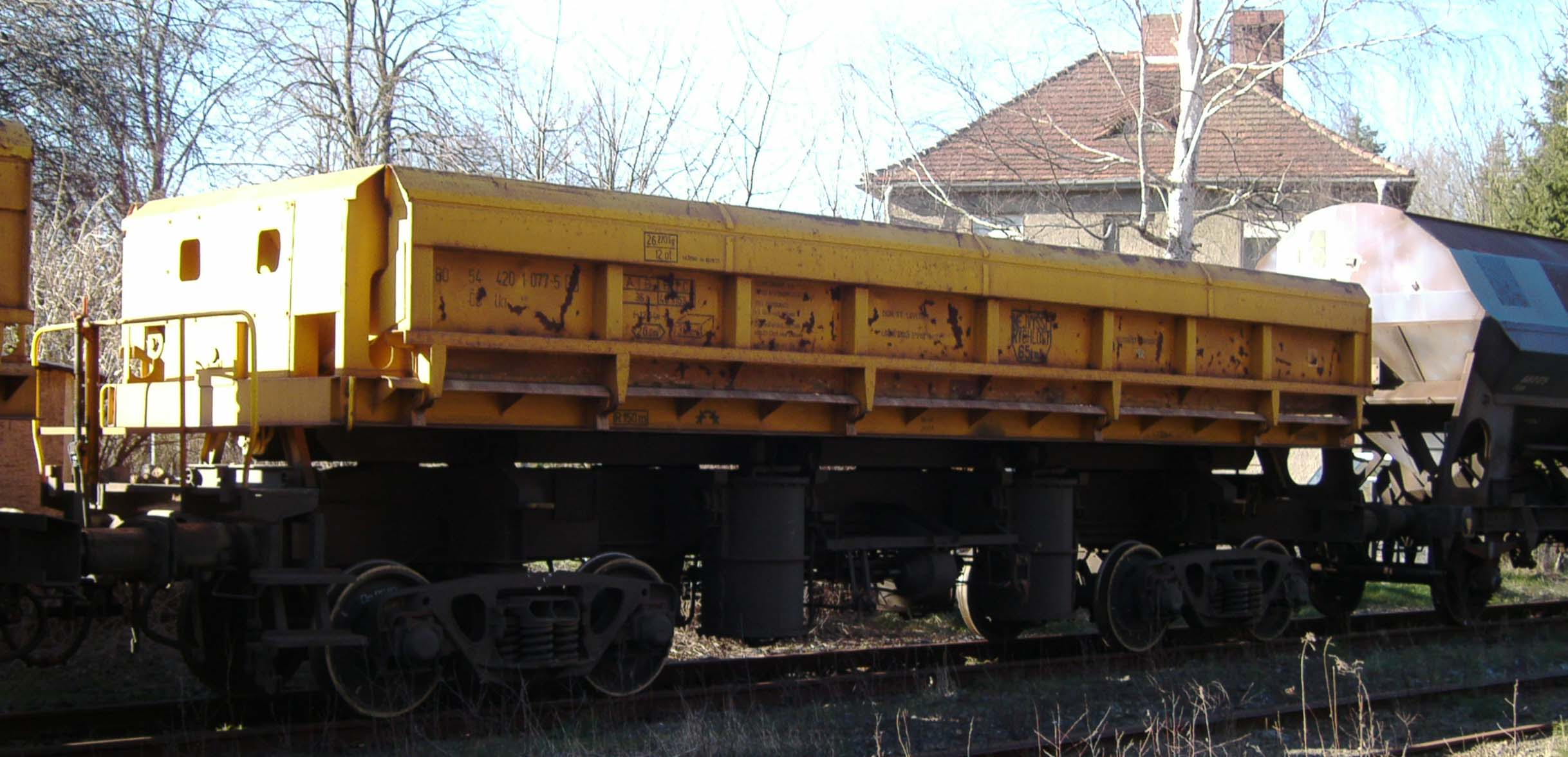
A Czech (ČD) side tipper

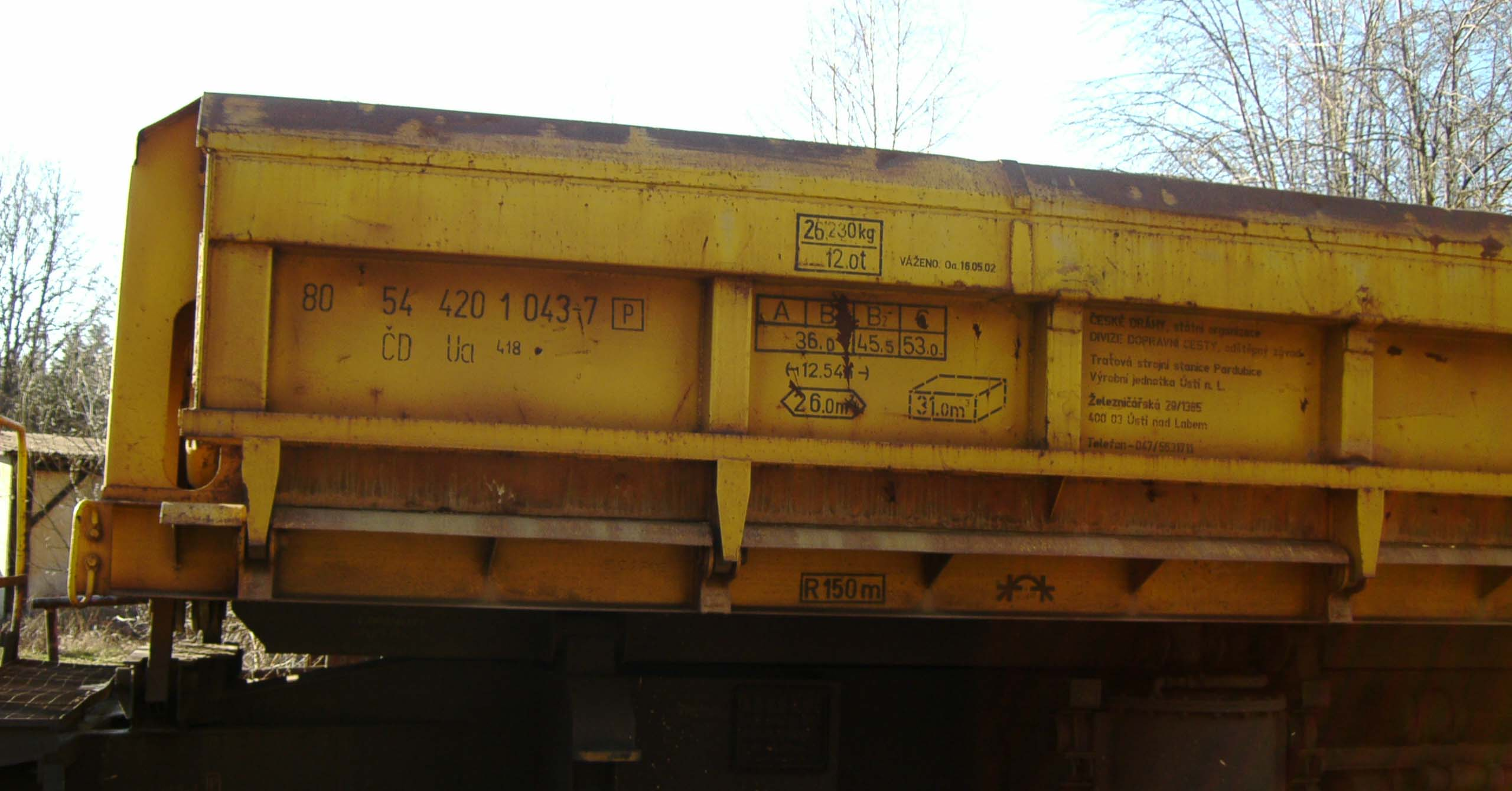
The ČD groups these wagons into Class Ua

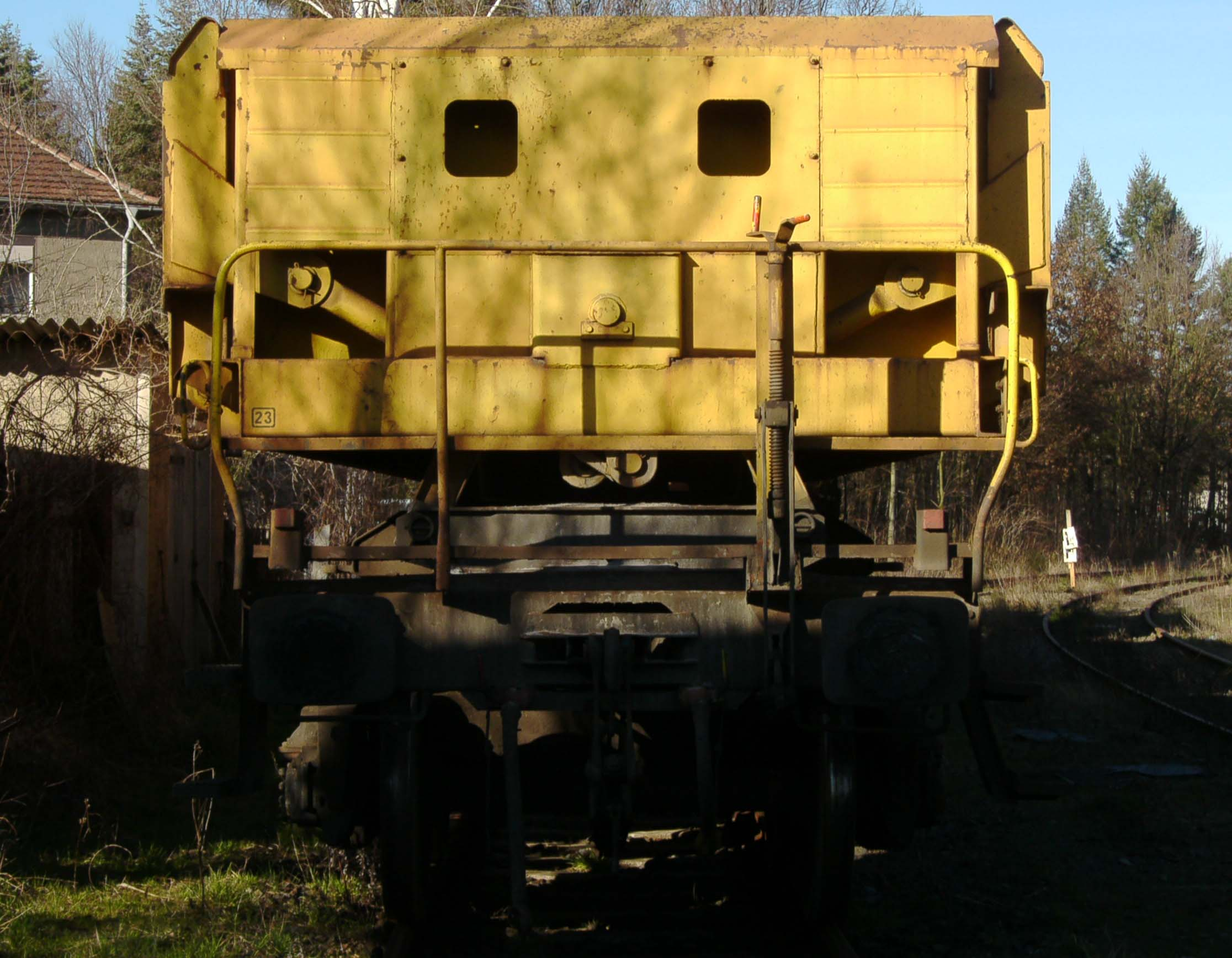
The tipping system can be seen from the end

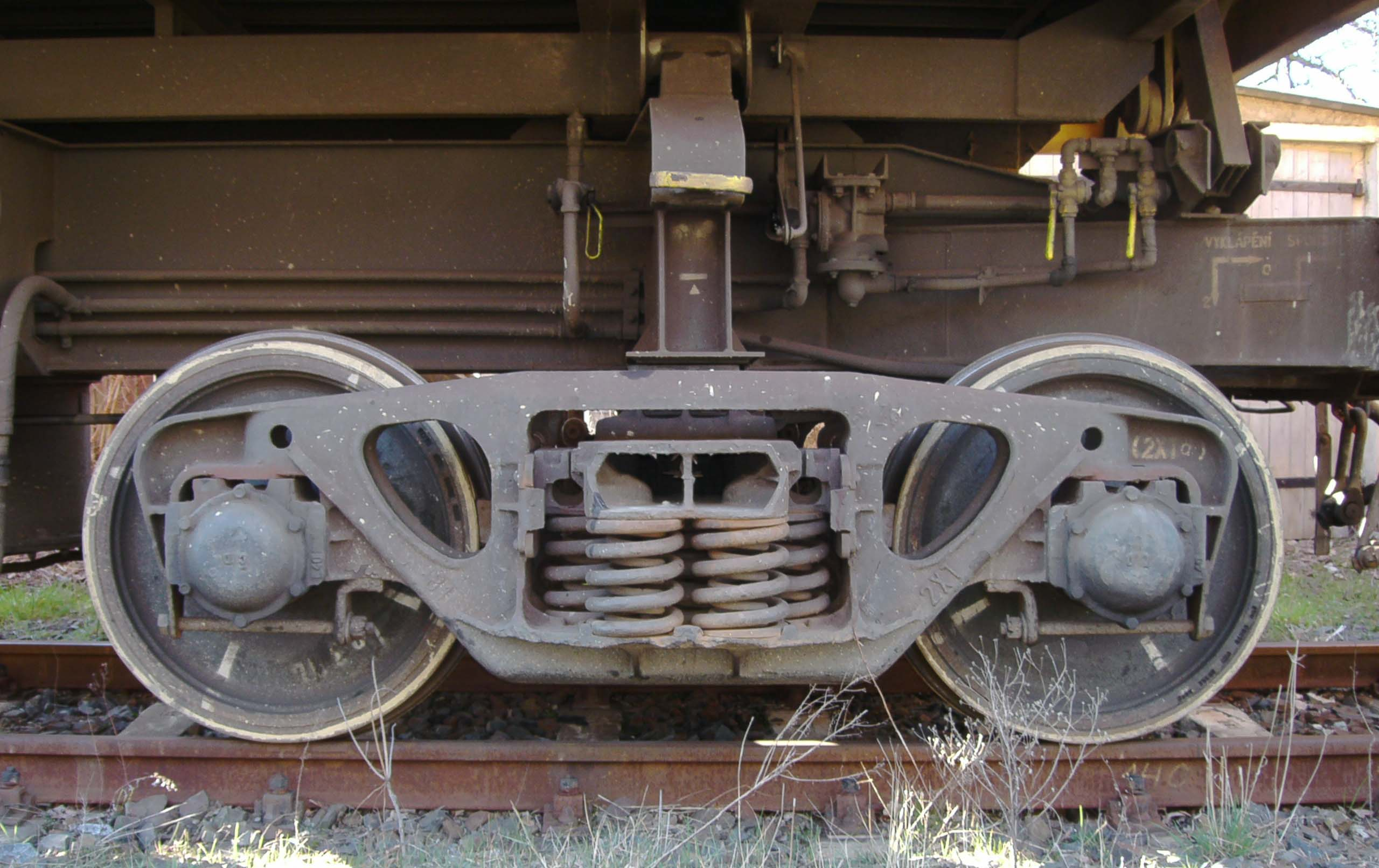
US-style bogie on a side-tipping wagon

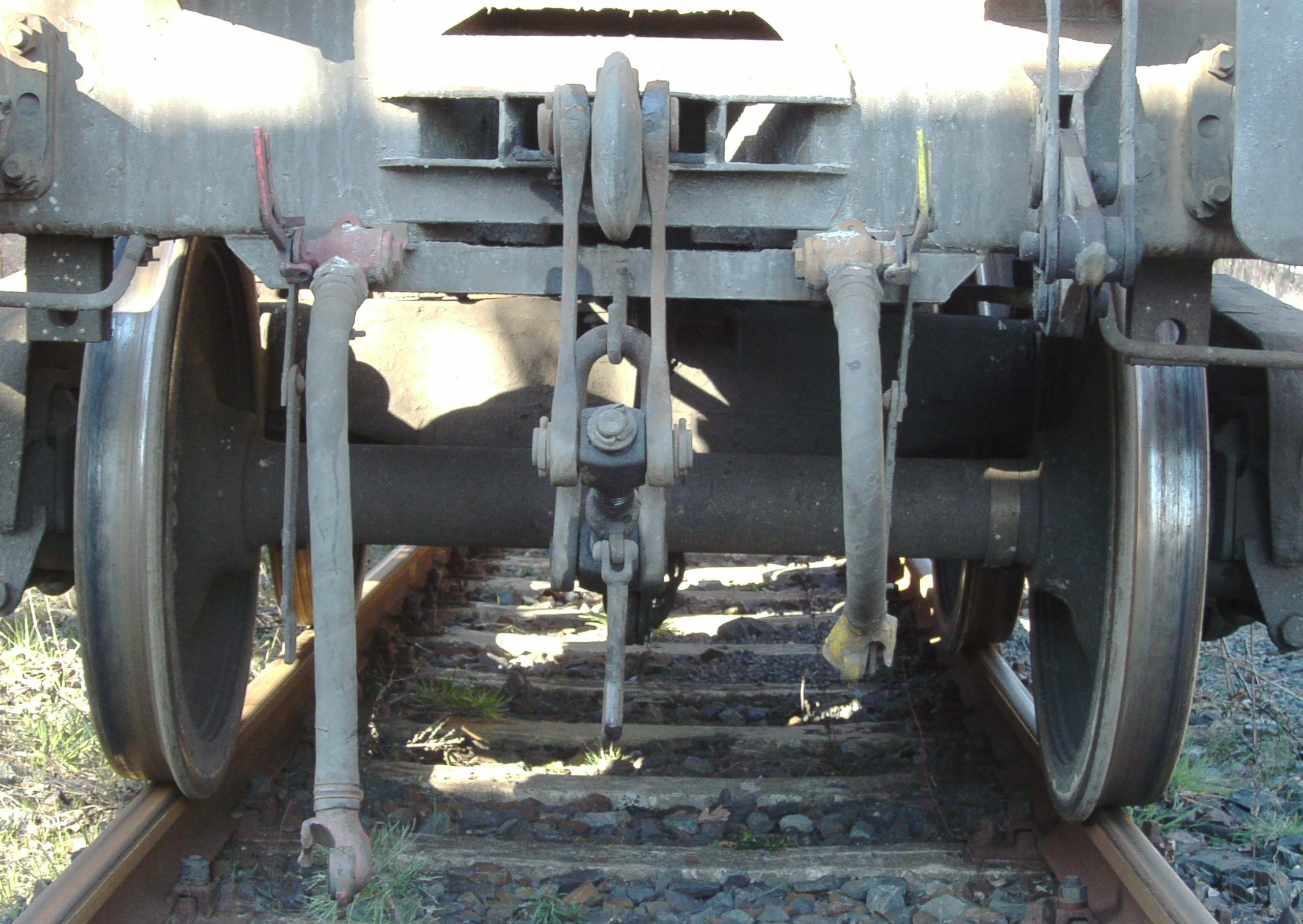
Coupling and main air pipe on a side-tipping wagon

== Specialized wagons ==
=== Lorry or mine car ===
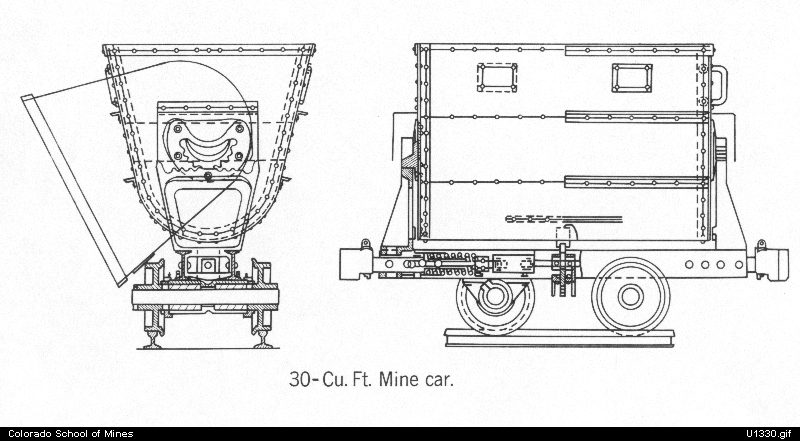
A 30 cu ft (0.85 m^{3}) mine car, drawing from the United States Bureau of Mines

A lorry or mine car is an open railroad car (gondola) with a tipping trough, used in mining. It is known in the UK as a tippler or chaldron wagon, and in the US as a mine car.

==== Chaldrons ====
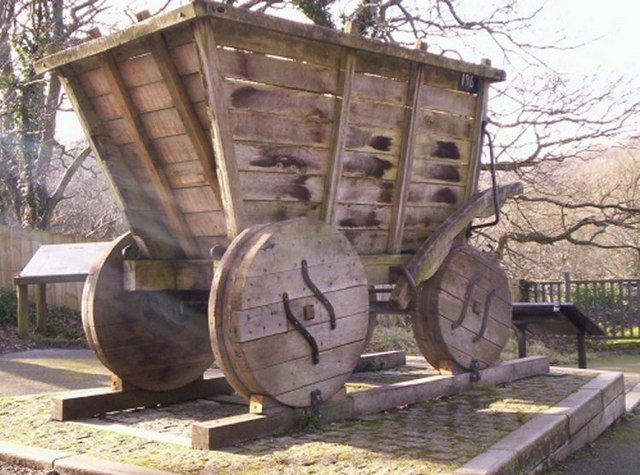
Replica of a chaldron wagon

The first railway bulk-cargo gondolas, the first freight wagons, were the chaldron cars of the early coal-carrying plateways. These were relatively short in length and tall in proportion, with a tapered body that widened upwards, above the wheels. Once locomotive haulage began, the unstable and top-heavy nature of this design became a problem with increasing speeds and later wagons became lower and longer.

=== Modalohr road trailer carriers ===
Modalohrs are specialized wagons for carrying road trailers and road tractors on the AFF route from France to Italy and Luxembourg to Spain and vice versa; there are plans to expand this service. A deck between the bogies (trucks) pivots (swings) 30°, allowing the trailers to be loaded from the sides. The cars are built by Lohr Industrie.

=== Intermodal open wagons ===
Examples of intermodal open wagons

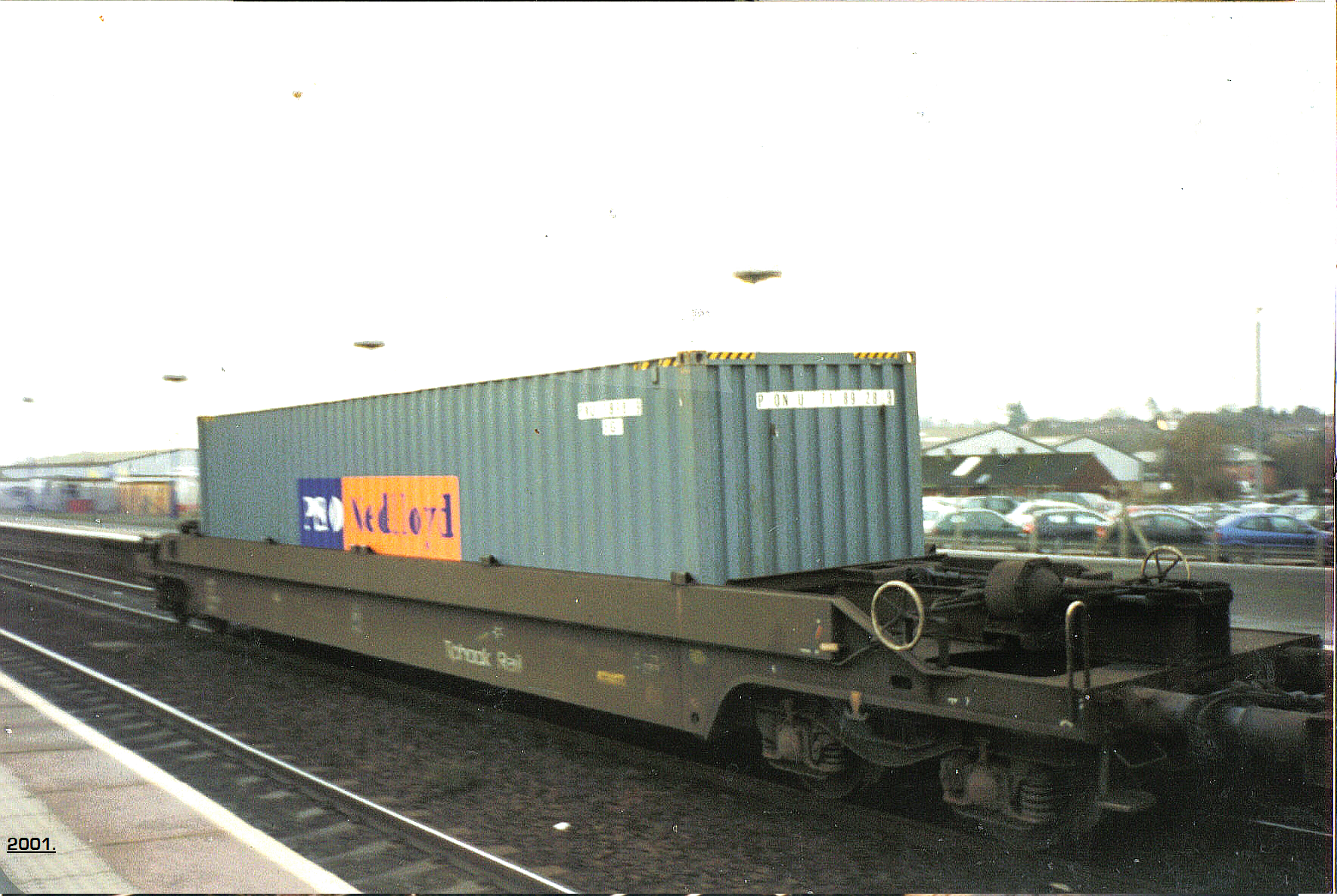
A Tiphook rail intermodal freight well car at Banbury station in the UK in 2001

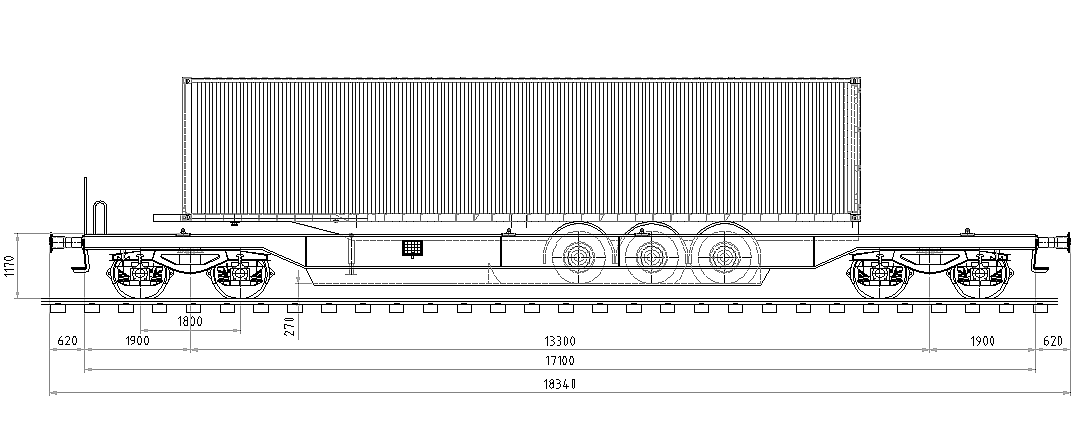
A pocket wagon

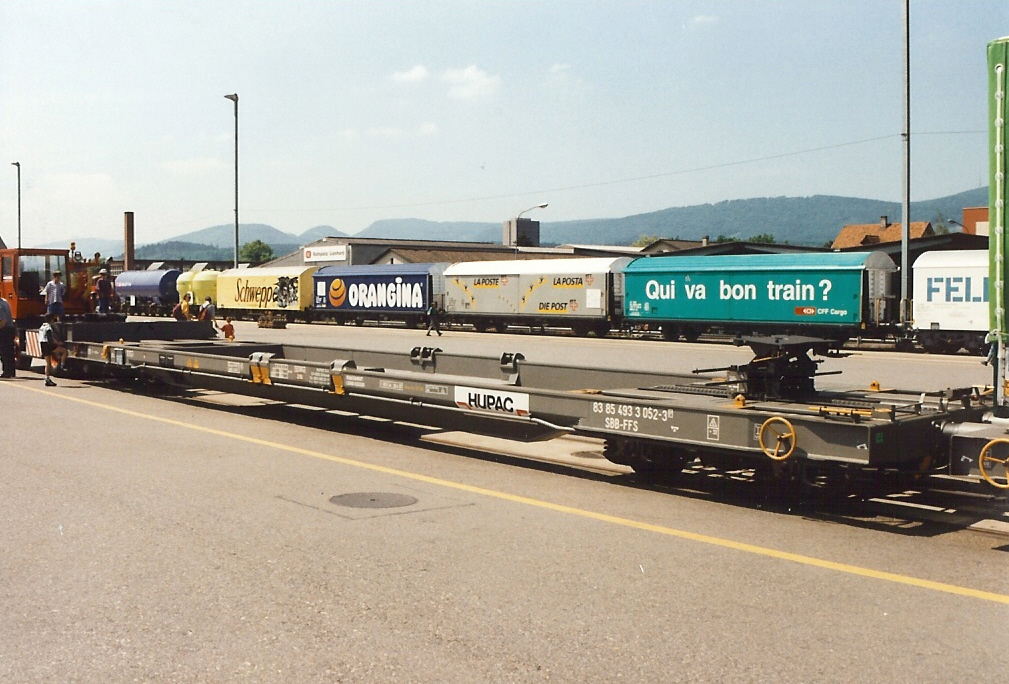
Special wagon of Hupac for semi-trailers

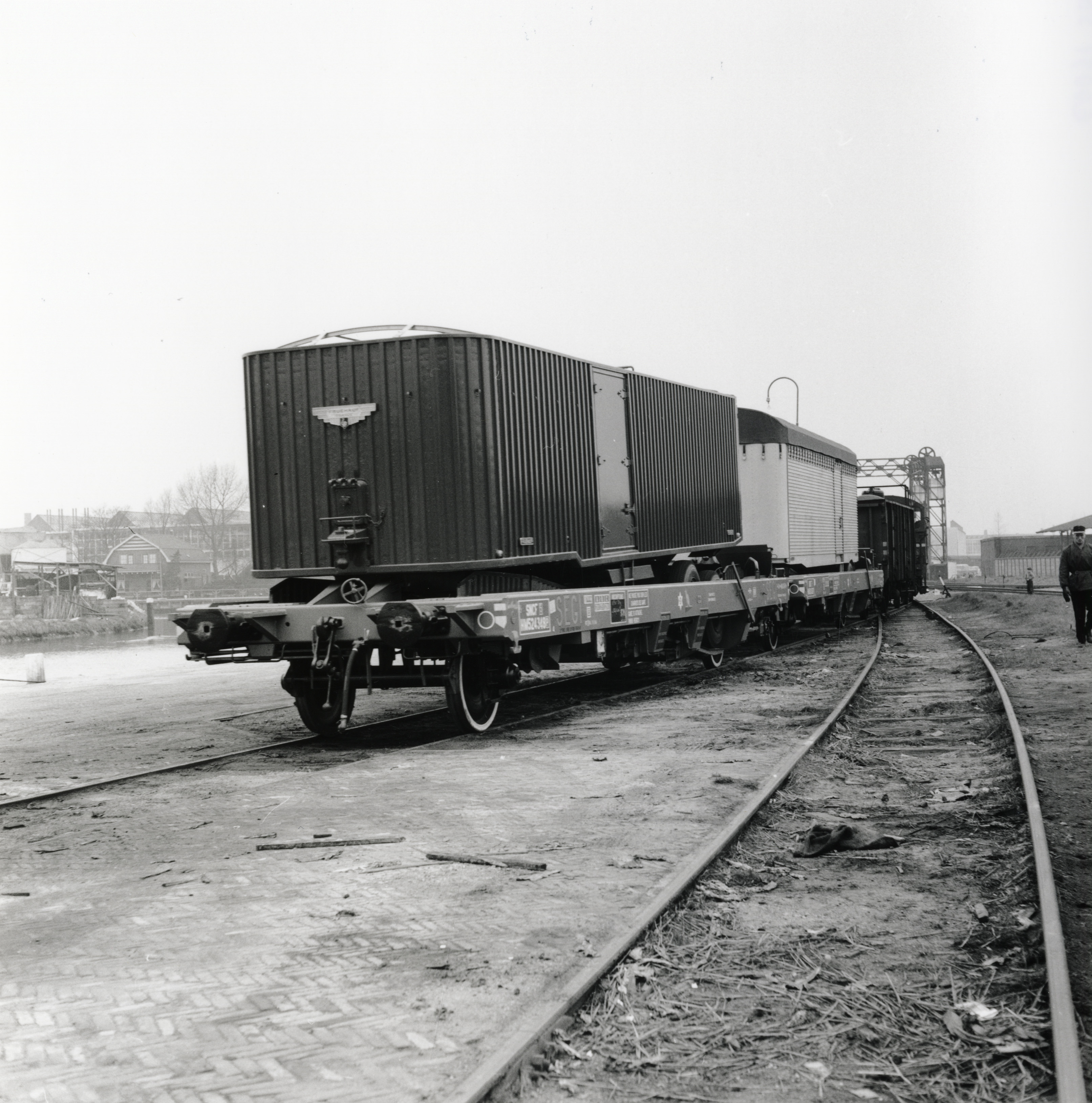
Semi-trailer on a Kangourou wagon

== See also ==
- Austauschbauart – German railway vehicles
- Class U special wagon
- German state railway norms – Standards for railway vehicles in Germany
- Holocaust trains § The journey and point of arrival – Used as prisoner transport in the Holocaust
- Kriegsbauart – Railway goods wagons developed in WWII
- Lowmac – Specialty rail wagon for transporting vehicles
- Quarry tub – Railway wagon used at quarries and mines
- Slate waggon – Specialized types of railway wagons
- Verbandsbauart – Goods wagon or tram in Germany
