= British Rail Departmental Wagons =

British Rail departmental wagons are wagons used by British Rail and their successors Railtrack and Network Rail for departmental purposes. Many vehicles are named after aquatic creatures (including fish, mammals, birds and mythical creatures), these names started life as telegraphic codes.

== List of Codes ==
Name	TOPS Code	Wagon Type	Image	Note
Barbel	ZKV	4 Wheel Open Wagon		Converted from MSV Iron Ore Tippler
Bass	ZDA	4 Wheel Open Wagon		
Bream	ZEA / ZEB / ZEX	Runner Wagon		
Brill	YAA	Bogie Flat Wagon		
Carp	ZBA	Open Wagon		
Catfish	ZEV	4 Wheel Ballast Hopper		
Chubb	ZCX	4 Wheel Open Wagon		
Clam	ZCV	4 Wheel Spoil Wagon		
Coalfish	MHA / MPA	4 Wheel Open Wagon		Converted from redundant HAA wagons
Cockle	-	Brake Van with Ballast Ploughs		
Cod	ZAV	4 Wheel Open Wagon		
Conger	YVQ / YXA			
Crab	ZBV / ZCV	4 Wheel Open Wagon		Converted from Lamprey wagons
Crayfish	-	A variant of a Mermaid Wagon		Never built
Dace	ZCV	4 Wheel Open Wagon		
Dogfish	ZFV / ZFW	4 Wheel Ballast Hopper		
Dolphin	YAO	Bogie Flat Wagon		
Eel	YMA	Bogie Flat Wagon		
Egret	ZCV	4 Wheel Spoil Wagon		Modified from Grampus wagons
Falcon	JNA	Bogied Open Wagon		
Hawk	JNA-Y	Bogied Open Wagon		modified Falcon wagons (2023)
Gane	YLO / YLP	Bogied Flat Wagon		
Gannet	-	4 Wheel Ballast Hopper		
Grampus	ZBO / ZBP / ZBQ / ZBV / ZBW	4 Wheel Open Wagon		
Gudgeon	-	Ballast Wagon		
Haddock	ZCO	4 Wheel Open Wagon		
Hake	ZBA	4 Wheel Open Wagon		
Halibut	YCA	Bogie Open Wagon		
Heron	YCV	Bogie Open Wagon		Based on a Turbot Wagon
Herring	ZLV	4 Wheel Ballast Hopper		
Lamprey	ZBO	4 Wheel Open Wagon		
Limpet	MKA / ZKA	4 Wheel Open Wagon		
Ling	ZCO	4 Wheel Open Wagon		
Lobster	ZVV	Engineer's Support Wagon		
Minnow	ZCO	4 Wheel Open Wagon		
Mackerel	ZMV	4 Wheel Ballast Hopper with Centre chutes		
Manta	YKA	Converted passenger carriage		Used as part of a long welded rail train
Marlin	YKA	Converted passenger carriage		Used as part of a long welded rail train
Merdog	ZFV	Ballast Hopper		
Mermaid	ZJV	4 Wheel Tipping open wagon		
Mullet	YLA	Bogie Flat Wagon		
Octopus	YDA	Bogie Ballast Hopper		
Osprey	YKA	Bogie Flat Wagon		A modified Salmon wagon
Otter	YXA	Bogie Wagon		Used as part of a long welded rail train
Oyster	ZUP	4 Wheel Brake Van with Ballast Ploughs		
Parr	YMA / YQA	Bogie Flat Wagon		
Perch	YEA	Bogie Flat Wagon		Used as part of a continuous welded rail train
Pike	ZAA	4 Wheel Open Wagon		
Pilchard	YCO	Bogie Open Wagon		
Piranha	PNA	Open Wagon		Unofficial Name
Plaice	ZCV	4 Wheel Open Wagon		
Pollock	ZCA	Open Wagon		
Porpoise	YEA	Bogie Chute Wagon		Used as part of a continuous welded rail train
Prawn	YNO	Bogie Flat Wagon		
Puffin	ZCV	4 Wheel Spoil Wagon		Converted from a Catfish wagon
Roach	ZDA	4 Wheel Open Wagon		
Rudd	ZBA	4 Wheel Open Wagon		
Salmon	YFA / YMA / YMB / YMO / YSA / YWA / YXA	Bogie Flat Wagon		
Sea Urchin	ZCA	4 Wheel Spoil Wagon		
Seacow	YGA / YGB	Bogie Ballast Hopper		
Seahare	YCA	4 Wheel Open Wagon		
Seahorse	ZCA	4 Wheel Open Wagon		
Seal	ZGA	Open Wagon		
Sealion	YGH	Bogie Ballast Hopper		
Shark	ZUA / ZUB / ZUP / ZUV / ZUW	Brake Van with Ballast Ploughs		
Shrimp	YNP	Bogie Flat Wagon		
Skate	YDA	Bogie Skip Wagon		
Sole	ZCA / ZCO	4 Wheel Open Wagon		
Squid	ZDA	4 Wheel Open Wagon		
Starfish	ZCO	4 Wheel Open Wagon		
Stingray	ZGA / YGB	Bogie Ballast Hopper with Generator		A Seacow wagon fitted with a generator
Sturgeon	YBA / YBB / YBO / YBP / YBQ	Bogie Open Wagon		
Super Trench	FJA	Bogie Container Flat		
Tope	ZCV / ZDV	4 Wheel Spoil Wagon		
Trident	-	Side Rail Loader		
Trout	ZFO	4 Wheel Ballast Hopper		
Tunny	ZCO / ZCV	4 Wheel Dropside wagon		
Turbot	ZCV / ZCW	Bogie Open Wagon		
Urchin	ZCA	Bogie Open Wagon		
Walrus	YGV	Bogie Ballast Hopper		
Whale	YBA / YHA	Bogie Ballast Hopper		
Whelk	YNO	Open Wagon		
Whiting	ZVV	4 Wheel Open Wagon		Use for the transportation of signaling equipment
Winkle	ZVV	4 Wheel Open Wagon		Use for the transportation of signaling equipment
Zander	zKV	4 Wheel Open Wagon		
