= Containerization =

Intermodal freight transport system

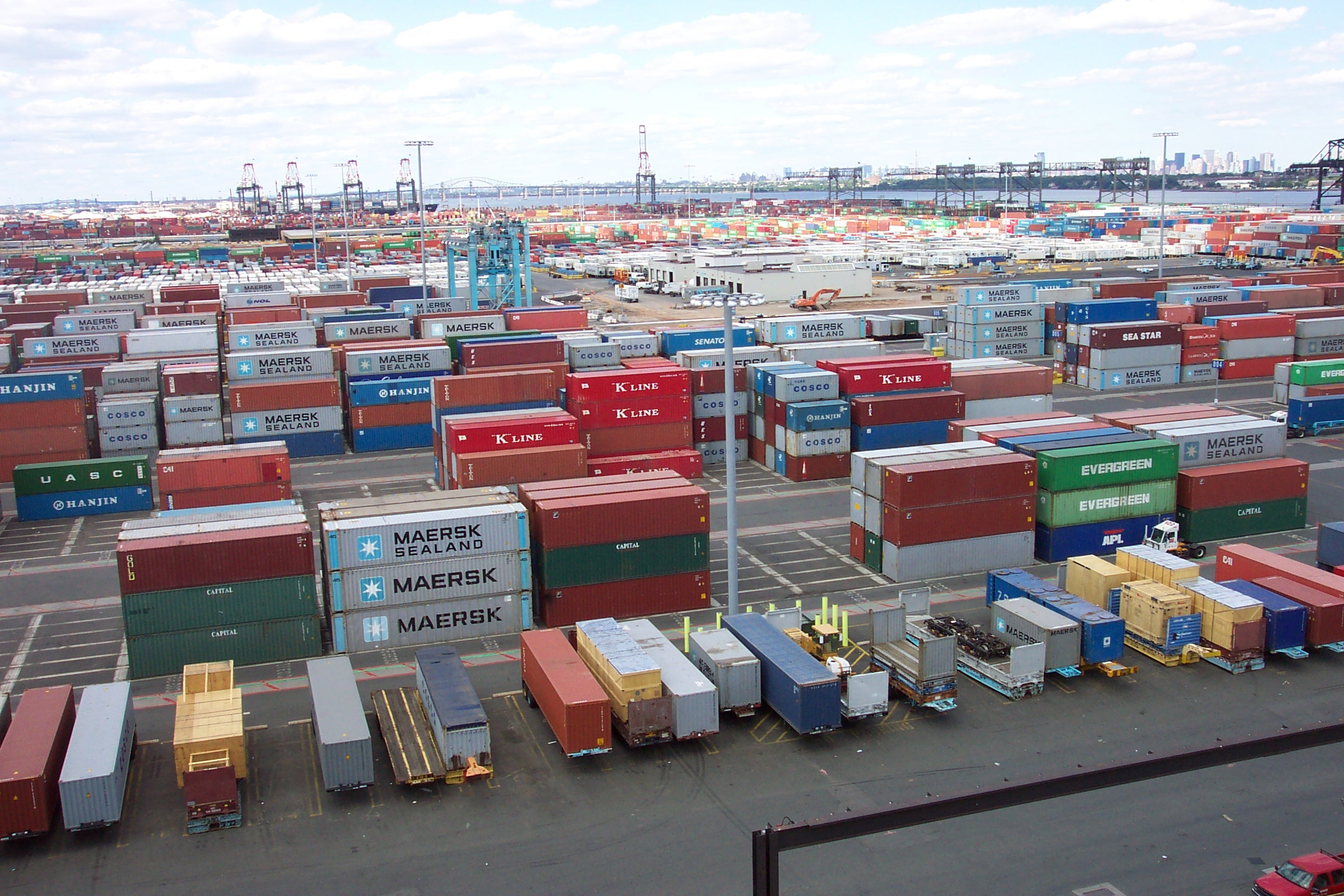
Shipping containers at the Port Newark-Elizabeth Marine Terminal in New Jersey, US

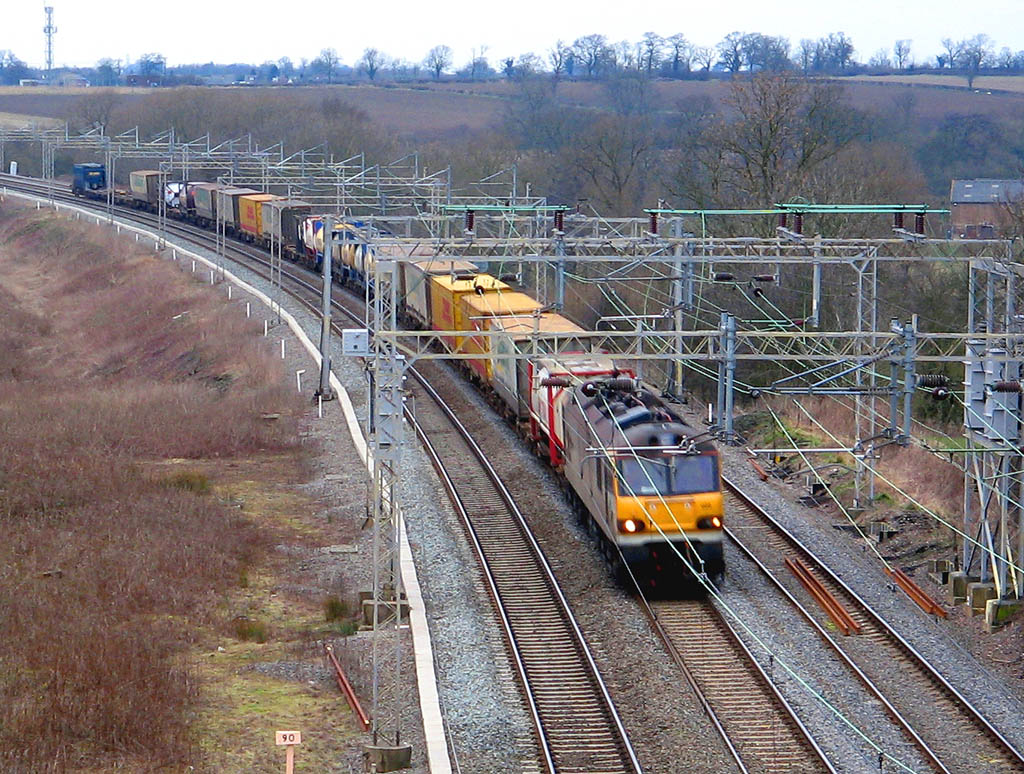
A container-goods train on the West Coast Main Line near Nuneaton, England

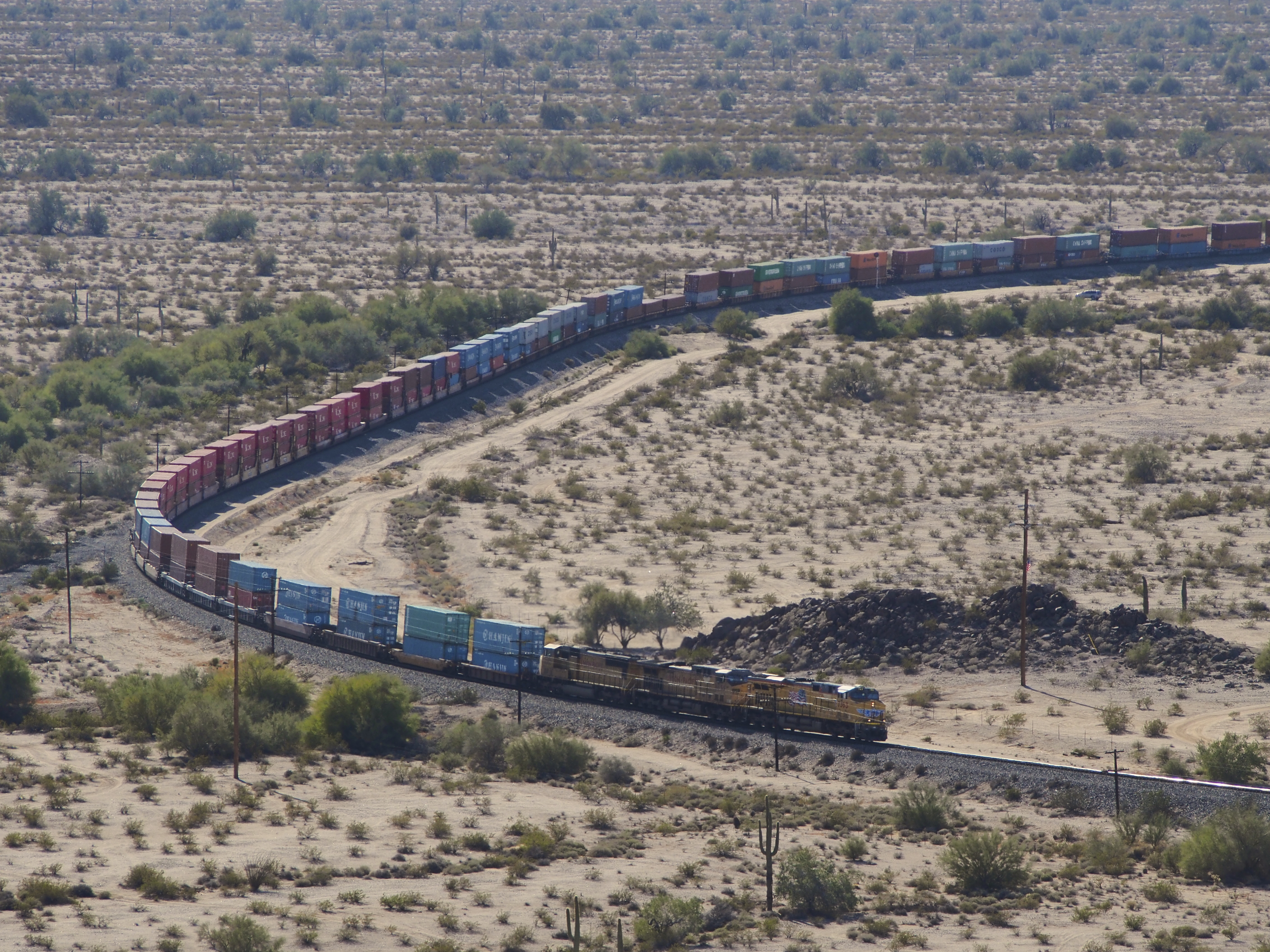
Double-stack Union Pacific container train crossing the desert at Shawmut, Arizona

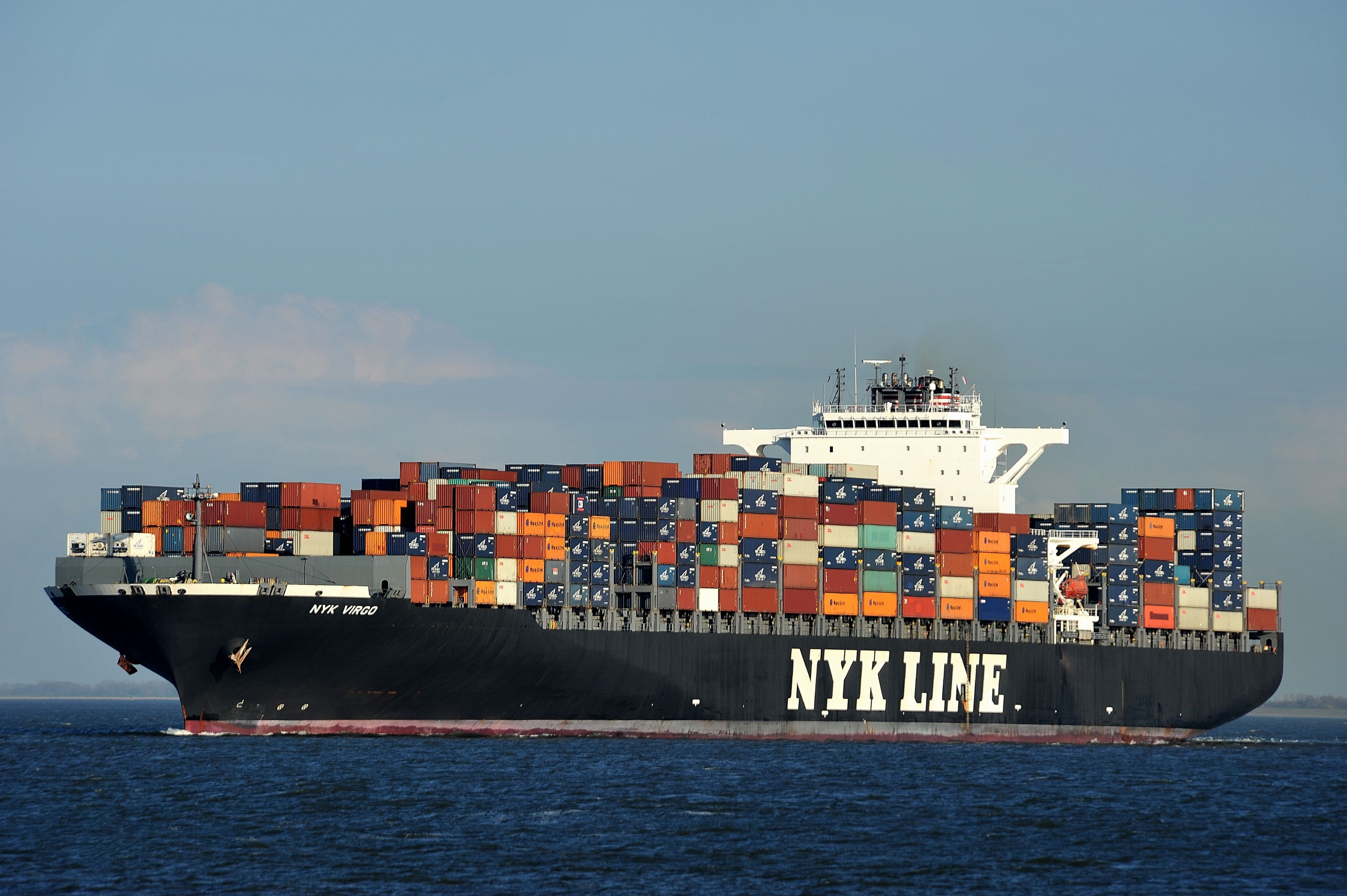
An ocean containership close to Cuxhaven, Germany

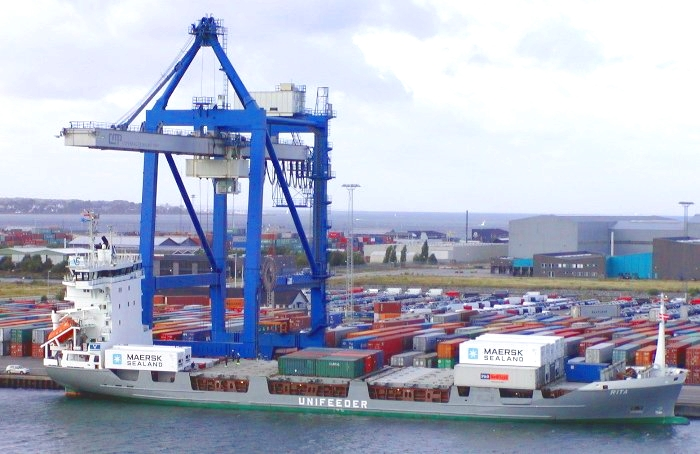
A container ship being loaded by a portainer crane in Copenhagen Harbor, Denmark.

Containerization, also referred as container stuffing or container loading, is a system of intermodal freight transport using intermodal containers. Containerization is the predominant form of unitization of export cargoes today, as opposed to other systems such as the barge system or palletization. The containers have standardized dimensions. They can be loaded and unloaded, stacked, transported efficiently over long distances, and transferred from one mode of transport to another—container ships, rail transport flatcars, and semi-trailer trucks—without being opened. The handling system is mechanized so that all handling is done with cranes and special forklift trucks. All containers are numbered and tracked using computerized systems.

Containerization originated several centuries ago but was not well developed or widely applied until after World War II, when it dramatically reduced the costs of transport, supported the post-war boom in international trade, and was a major element in globalization. Containerization eliminated manual sorting of most shipments and the need for dock front warehouses, while displacing many thousands of dock workers who formerly simply handled break bulk cargo. Containerization reduced congestion in ports, significantly shortened shipping time, and reduced losses from damage and theft.

Containers can be made from a wide range of materials such as steel, fibre-reinforced polymer, aluminum or a combination. Containers made from weathering steel are used to minimize maintenance needs.

== Origin ==
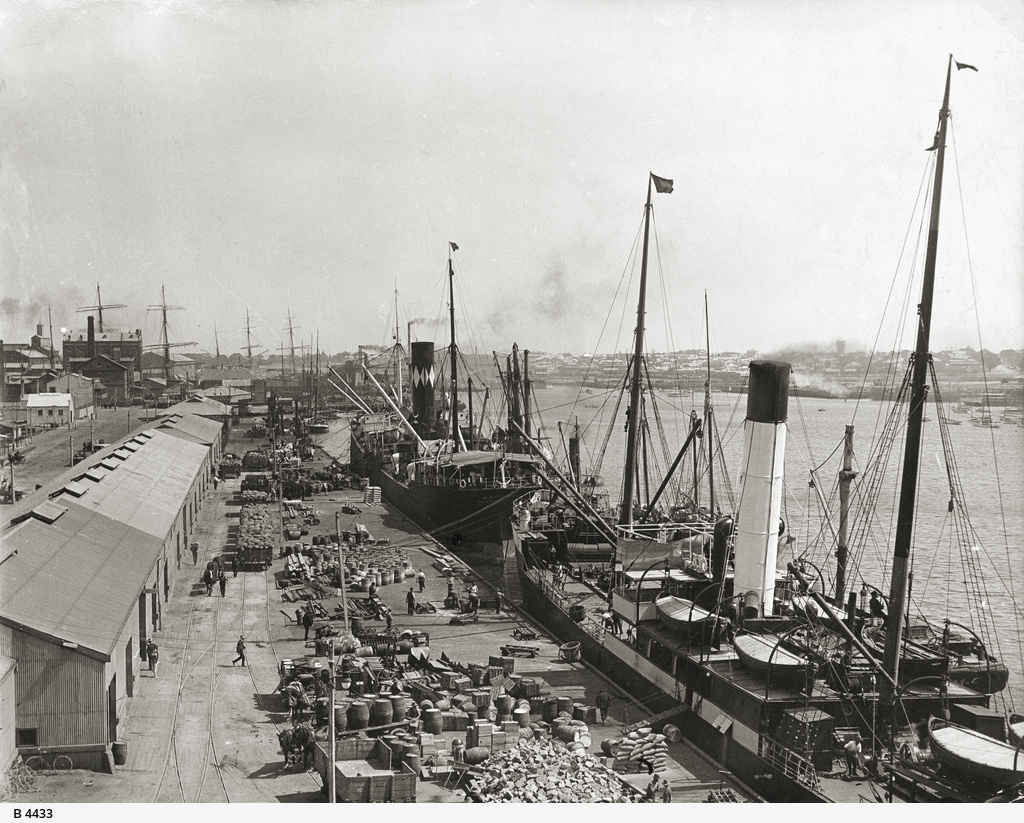
Loading assorted break bulk cargo onto ships manually

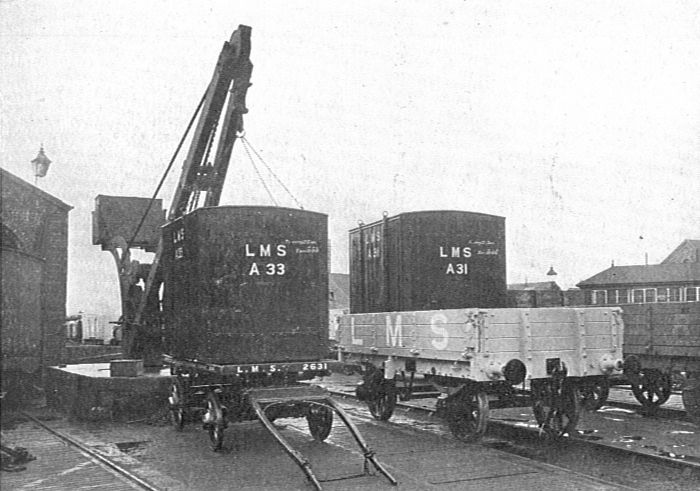
Transferring freight containers on the London, Midland and Scottish Railway 1928

Before containerization, goods were usually handled manually as break bulk cargo. Typically, goods would be loaded onto a vehicle from the factory and taken to a port warehouse where they would be offloaded and stored awaiting the next vessel. When the vessel arrived, they would be moved to the side of the ship along with other cargo to be lowered or carried into the hold and packed by dock workers. The ship might call at several other ports before off-loading a given consignment of cargo. Each port visit would delay the delivery of other cargo. Delivered cargo might then have been offloaded into another warehouse before being picked up and delivered to its destination. Multiple handling and delays made transport costly, time-consuming and unreliable.

Containerization has its origins in early coal mining regions in England beginning in the late 18th century. In 1766 James Brindley designed the "starvationer" box boat with ten wooden containers, to transport coal from Worsley Delph (quarry) to Manchester by Bridgewater Canal. In 1795, Benjamin Outram opened the Little Eaton Gangway, upon which coal was carried in wagons built at his Butterley Ironwork. The horse-drawn wheeled wagons on the gangway took the form of containers, which, loaded with coal, could be transshipped from canal barges on the Derby Canal, which Outram had also promoted.

By the 1830s, railroads were carrying containers that could be transferred to other modes of transport. The Liverpool and Manchester Railway in the UK was one of these, making use of "simple rectangular timber boxes" to convey coal from Lancashire collieries to Liverpool, where a crane transferred them to horse-drawn carriages. Originally used for moving coal on and off barges, "loose boxes" were used to containerize coal from the late 1780s, at places like the Bridgewater Canal. By the 1840s, iron boxes were in use as well as wooden ones. The early 1900s saw the adoption of closed container boxes designed for movement between road and rail.

=== Twentieth century ===
On 17 May 1917, Louisville, Kentucky, native Benjamin Franklin "B. F." Fitch (1877–1956) launched commercial use of "demountable bodies" in Cincinnati, Ohio, which he had designed as transferable containers. In 1919, his system was extended to over 200 containers serving 21 railway stations with 14 freight trucks.

In 1919, engineer Stanisław Rodowicz developed the first draft of the container system in Poland. In 1920, he built a prototype of the biaxial wagon. The Polish-Bolshevik War stopped development of the container system in Poland.

The U.S. Post Office contracted with the New York Central Railroad to move mail via containers in May 1921.

In 1926, a regular connection of the luxury passenger train from London to Paris, Golden Arrow/Fleche d'Or, by Southern Railway and French Northern Railway, began. For transport of passengers' baggage four containers were used. These containers were loaded in London or Paris and carried to ports, Dover or Calais, on flat cars in the UK and "CIWL Pullman Golden Arrow Fourgon of CIWL" in France.

Beginning in March 1928 the Pennsylvania Railroad (PRR) introduced an extensive container service network connecting New York, Philadelphia, Baltimore, South Kearney, New Jersey, Buffalo, Cleveland and Pittsburg.

At the Second World Motor Transport Congress in Rome, September 1928, Italian senator Silvio Crespi proposed the use of containers for road and railway transport systems, using collaboration rather than competition. This would be done under the auspices of an international organ similar to the Sleeping Car Company, which provided international carriage of passengers in sleeping wagons.

After the Wall Street crash of 1929 in New York and the subsequent Great Depression, many countries were without any means to transport cargo. The railroads were sought as a possibility to transport cargo, and there was an opportunity to bring containers into broader use.

In 1930, the Chicago & Northwestern Railroad began shipping containers between Chicago and Milwaukee. Their efforts ended in the spring of 1931 when the Interstate Commerce Commission disallowed the use of a flat rate for the containers.

In February 1931 the first container ship was launched. It was called the Autocarrier, owned by Southern Railway UK. It had 21 slots for containers of Southern Railway. Under auspices of the International Chamber of Commerce in Paris in Venice on September 30, 1931, on one of the platforms of the Maritime Station (Mole di Ponente), practical tests assessed the best construction for European containers as part of an international competition. In 1931, in the U.S., B. F. Fitch designed the two largest and heaviest containers in existence. One measured 17 ft 6 in (5.33 m) by 8 ft 0 in (2.44 m) by 8 ft 0 in (2.44 m) with a capacity of 30,000 pounds (14,000 kg) in 890 cubic feet (25 m^{3}), and a second measured 20 ft 0 in (6.10 m) by 8 ft 0 in (2.44 m) by 8 ft 0 in (2.44 m), with a capacity of 50,000 pounds (23,000 kg) in 1,000 cubic feet (28 m^{3}).

In November 1932, in Enola, Pennsylvania, the first container terminal in the world was opened by the Pennsylvania Railroad. The Fitch hooking system was used for reloading of the containers.

In 1933 in Europe, under the auspices of the International Chamber of Commerce, the International Container Bureau (French: Bureau International des Conteneurs, B.I.C.) was established. In June 1933, the B.I.C. decided on obligatory parameters for containers used in international traffic. Containers handled by means of lifting gear, such as cranes, overhead conveyors, etc. for traveling elevators (group I containers), constructed after July 1, 1933. Obligatory Regulations:

- Clause 1. Containers are, as regards form, either of the closed or the open type, and, as regards capacity, either of the heavy or the light type.
- Clause 2. The loading capacity of containers must be such that their total weight (load, plus tare) is: 5 tonnes (4.92 long tons; 5.51 short tons) for containers of the heavy type; 2.5 tonnes (2.46 long tons; 2.76 short tons) for containers of the light type; a tolerance of 5 percent excess on the total weight is allowable under the same conditions as for wagon loads.

Obligatory norms for European containers since 1 July 1933
Category	length [m (ftin)]	[m (ftin)]	[m (ftin)]	Total mass [tons]
Heavy types
Close type 62	3.25 m (10 ft 8 in)	2.15 m (7 ft 5/8 in)	2.20 m (7 ft 2 5/8 in)	5 t (4.92 long tons; 5.51 short tons)
Close type 42	2.15 m (7 ft 5/8 in)	2.15 m (7 ft 5/8 in)	2.20 m (7 ft 2 5/8 in)	5 t (4.92 long tons; 5.51 short tons)
Open type 61	3.25 m (10 ft 8 in)	2.15 m (7 ft 5/8 in)	1.10 m (3 ft 7 1/4 in)	5 t (4.92 long tons; 5.51 short tons)
Open type 41	2.15 m (7 ft 5/8 in)	2.15 m (7 ft 5/8 in)	1.10 m (3 ft 7 1/4 in)	5 t (4.92 long tons; 5.51 short tons)
Light Type
Close type 22	2.15 m (7 ft 5/8 in)	1.05 m (3 ft 5 3/8 in)	2.20 m (7 ft 2 5/8 in)	2.5 t (2.46 long tons; 2.76 short tons)
Close type 201	2.15 m (7 ft 5/8 in)	1.05 m (3 ft 5 3/8 in)	1.10 m (3 ft 7 1/4 in)	2.5 t (2.46 long tons; 2.76 short tons)
Open type 21	2.15 m (7 ft 5/8 in)	1.05 m (3 ft 5 3/8 in)	1.10 m (3 ft 7 1/4 in)	2.5 t (2.46 long tons; 2.76 short tons)

In April 1935 BIC established a second standard for European containers:

Obligatory norms for European containers since 1 April 1935
Category	Length [m (ftin)]	Width [m (ftin)]	High [m (ftin)]	Total mass [tons]
Heavy types
Close 62	3.25 m (10 ft 8 in)	2.15 m (7 ft 5/8 in)	2.55 m (8 ft 4 3/8 in)	5 t (4.92 long tons; 5.51 short tons)
Close 42	2.15 m (7 ft 5/8 in)	2.15 m (7 ft 5/8 in)	2.55 m (8 ft 4 3/8 in)	5 t (4.92 long tons; 5.51 short tons)
Open 61	3.25 m (10 ft 8 in)	2.15 m (7 ft 5/8 in)	1.125 m (3 ft 8 5/16 in)	5 t (4.92 long tons; 5.51 short tons)
Open 41	2.15 m (7 ft 5/8 in)	2.15 m (7 ft 5/8 in)	1.125 m (3 ft 8 5/16 in)	5 t (4.92 long tons; 5.51 short tons)
Light Type
Close 32	1.50 m (4 ft 11 in)	2.15 m (7 ft 5/8 in)	2.55 m (8 ft 4 3/8 in)	2.5 t (2.46 long tons; 2.76 short tons)
Close 22	1.05 m (3 ft 5 3/8 in)	2.15 m (7 ft 5/8 in)	2.55 m (8 ft 4 3/8 in)	2.5 t (2.46 long tons; 2.76 short tons)

From 1926 to 1947 in the U.S., the Chicago North Shore and Milwaukee Railway carried motor carrier vehicles and shippers' vehicles loaded on flatcars between Milwaukee, Wisconsin, and Chicago, Illinois. Beginning in 1929, Seatrain Lines carried railroad boxcars on its sea vessels to transport goods between New York and Cuba.

In the mid-1930s, the Chicago Great Western Railway and then the New Haven Railroad began "piggyback" service (transporting highway freight trailers on flatcars) limited to their own railroads. The Chicago Great Western Railway filed a U.S. patent in 1938 on their method of securing trailers to a flatcars using chains and turnbuckles. Other components included wheel chocks and ramps for loading and unloading the trailers from the flatcars. By 1953, the Chicago, Burlington and Quincy, the Chicago and Eastern Illinois, and the Southern Pacific railroads had joined the innovation. Most of the rail cars used were surplus flatcars equipped with new decks. By 1955, an additional 25 railroads had begun some form of piggyback trailer service.

==== World War II ====
During World War II, the Australian Army used containers to more easily deal with various breaks of gauge in the railroads. These non-stackable containers were about the size of the later 20-foot ISO container and perhaps made mainly of wood.

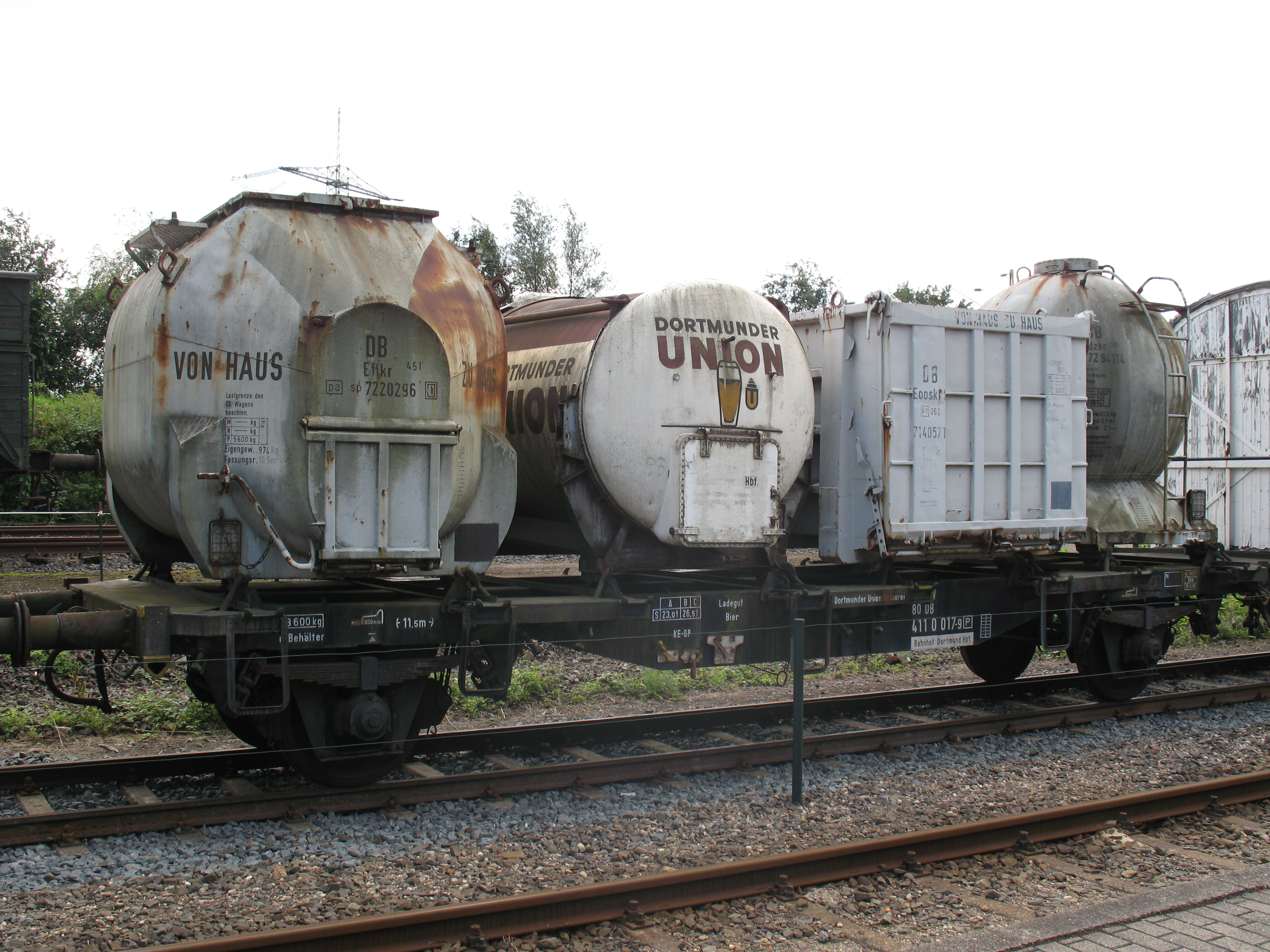
Freight car in railway museum Bochum-Dahlhausen, showing four different UIC-590 pa-containers

During the same time, the United States Army started to combine items of uniform size, lashing them onto a pallet, unitizing cargo to speed the loading and unloading of transport ships. In 1947 the Transportation Corps developed the Transporter, a rigid, corrugated steel container with a 9,000 lb (4,100 kg) carrying capacity, for shipping household goods of officers in the field. It was 8 ft 6 in (2.59 m) long, 6 ft 3 in (1.91 m), and 6 ft 10 in (2.08 m) high, with double doors on one end, mounted on skids, and had lifting rings on the top four corners. During the Korean War the Transporter was evaluated for handling sensitive military equipment and, proving effective, was approved for broader use. Theft of material and damage to wooden crates convinced the army that steel containers were needed.

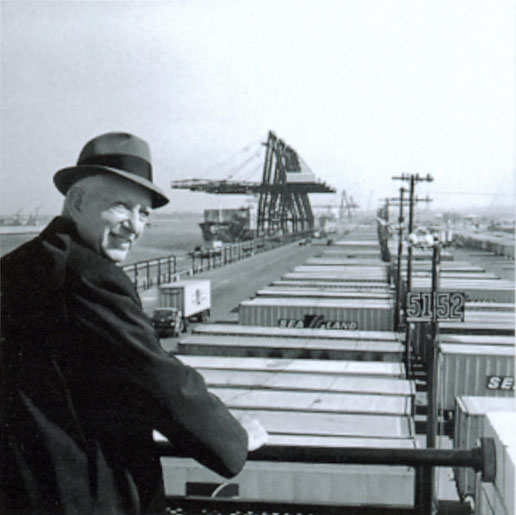
Malcom McLean at railing, Port Newark, 1957

==== Mid-twentieth century ====
In April 1951, at Zürich Tiefenbrunnen railway station, the Swiss Museum of Transport and Bureau International des Containers (BIC) held demonstrations of container systems, with the aim of selecting the best solution for Western Europe. Present were representatives from France, Belgium, the Netherlands, Germany, Switzerland, Sweden, Great Britain, Italy and the United States. The system chosen for Western Europe was based on the Netherlands' system for consumer goods and waste transportation called Laadkisten (literally, "loading bins"), in use since 1934. This system used roller containers that were moved by rail, truck and ship, in various configurations up to a capacity of 5,500 kg (12,100 lb), and up to 3.1 by 2.3 by 2 metres (10 ft 2 in × 7 ft 6 1/2 in × 6 ft 6 3/4 in) size. This became the first post World War II European railway standard UIC 590, known as "pa-Behälter." It was implemented in the Netherlands, Belgium, Luxembourg, West Germany, Switzerland, Sweden and Denmark. With the popularization of the larger ISO containers, support for pa containers was phased out by the railways. In the 1970s they began to be widely used for transporting waste.

In 1952 the U.S. Army developed the Transporter into the CONtainer EXpress or CONEX box system. The size and capacity of the CONEXes were about the same as the Transporter, (Note: (8'6" length, 6'3" width and 6'10½" height, and 9000 lbs capacity),) but the system was made modular, by the addition of a smaller, half-size unit of 6 ft 3 in (1.91 m) long, 4 ft 3 in (1.30 m) wide and 6 ft 10 1/2 in (2.10 m) high. (Note: Some sources also mention a 12-foot version. and a third version, the CONEX III of 8 by 8 by 6.5 feet (2.44 m × 2.44 m × 1.98 m), and a capacity of 13,000 lbs was being developed. Connecting devices were intended to join three CONEX-III containers together into one 20-feet long unit, a standard recommended by the American Standards Association, for use in commercial rail, highway, and water shipping.) CONEXes could be stacked three high, and protected their contents from the elements.

The first major shipment of CONEXes, containing engineering supplies and spare parts, was made by rail from the Columbus General Depot in Georgia to the Port of San Francisco, then by ship to Yokohama, Japan, and then to Korea, in late 1952. Transit times were almost halved. By the time of the Vietnam War the majority of supplies and materials were shipped by CONEX. By 1965 the U.S. military used some 100,000 CONEX boxes, and more than 200,000 in 1967. making this the first worldwide application of intermodal containers. After the US Department of Defense standardized an 8-by-8-foot (2.44 by 2.44 m) cross section container in multiples of 10-foot (3.05 m) lengths for military use, it was rapidly adopted for shipping purposes.

In 1955, former trucking company owner Malcom McLean worked with engineer Keith Tantlinger to develop the modern intermodal container. All the containerization pioneers who came before McLean had thought in terms of optimizing particular modes of transport. McLean's "fundamental insight" which made the intermodal container possible was that the core business of the shipping industry "was moving cargo, not sailing ships". He visualized and helped to bring about a world reoriented around that insight, which required not just standardization of the metal containers themselves, but drastic changes to every aspect of cargo handling.

In 1955, McLean and Tantlinger's immediate challenge was to design a shipping container that could efficiently be loaded onto ships and would hold securely on sea voyages. The result was an 8-foot-tall (2.44 m) by 8 ft-wide (2.44 m) box in 10 ft-long (3.05 m) units constructed from 2.5 mm-thick (13/128 in) corrugated steel. The design incorporated a twistlock mechanism atop each of the four corners, allowing the container to be easily secured and lifted using cranes. Several years later, as a Fruehauf executive, Tantlinger went back to McLean and convinced him to relinquish control of their design to help stimulate the container revolution. On January 29, 1963, McLean's company SeaLand released its patent rights, so that Tantlinger's inventions could become "the basis for a standard corner fitting and twist lock". Tantlinger was deeply involved in the debates and negotiations which in back-to-back votes in September 1965 (on September 16 and 24, respectively) led to the adoption of a modified version of the Sea-Land design as the American and then the international standard for corner fittings for shipping containers. This began international standardization of shipping containers.

=== Purpose-built ships ===
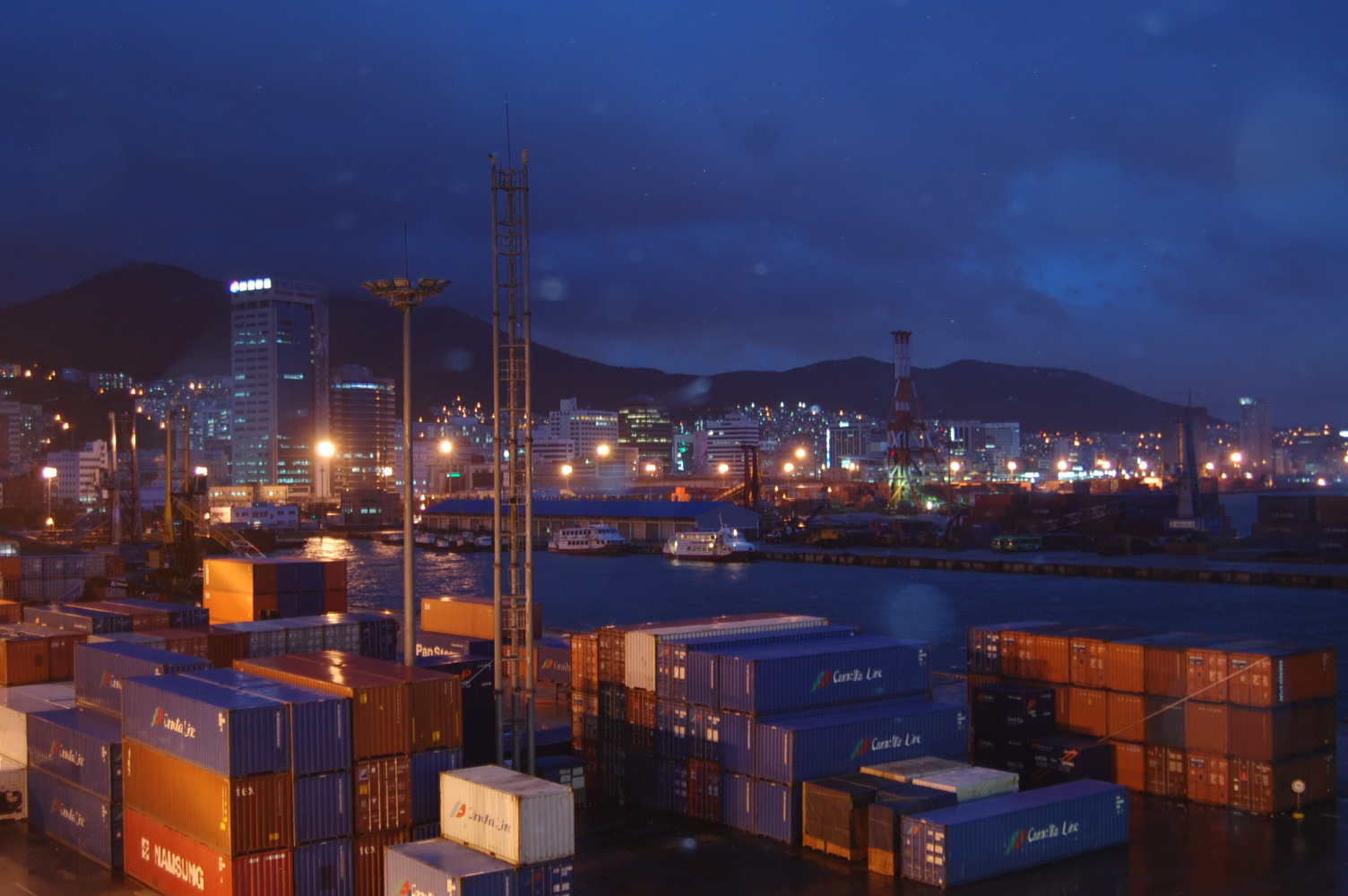
Containers waiting at the South Korean port of Busan.

The first vessels purpose-built to carry containers had begun operation in 1926 for the regular connection of the luxury passenger train between London and Paris, the Golden Arrow/Fleche d'Or. Four containers were used for the conveyance of passengers' baggage. These containers were loaded in London or Paris and carried to the ports of Dover or Calais. In February 1931 the first container ship in the world was launched. It was called the Autocarrier, owned by the UK's Southern Railway. It had 21 slots for containers of Southern Railway.

The next step was in Europe after World War II. Vessels purpose-built to carry containers were used between UK and Netherlands and also in Denmark in 1951. In the United States, ships began carrying containers in 1951, between Seattle, Washington, and Alaska. None of these services was particularly successful. First, the containers were rather small, with 52% of them having a volume of less than 3 cubic metres (106 cu ft). Almost all European containers were made of wood and used canvas lids, and they required additional equipment for loading into rail or truck bodies.

The world's first purpose-built container vessel was Clifford J. Rodgers, built in Montreal in 1955 and owned by the White Pass and Yukon Corporation. Her first trip carried 600 containers between North Vancouver, British Columbia, and Skagway, Alaska, on November 26, 1955. In Skagway, the containers were unloaded to purpose-built railroad cars for transport north to Yukon, in the first intermodal service using trucks, ships, and railroad cars. Southbound containers were loaded by shippers in Yukon and moved by rail, ship, and truck to their consignees without opening. This first intermodal system operated from November 1955 until 1982.

The first truly successful container shipping company dates to April 26, 1956, when American trucking entrepreneur McLean put 58 trailer vans later called containers, aboard a refitted tanker ship, the SS Ideal X, and sailed them from Newark, New Jersey, to Houston, Texas. Independently of the events in Canada, McLean had the idea of using large containers that never opened in transit and that were transferable on an intermodal basis, among trucks, ships, and railroad cars. McLean had initially favored the construction of "trailerships"—taking trailers from large trucks and stowing them in a ship's cargo hold. This method of stowage, referred to as roll-on/roll-off, was not adopted because of the large waste in potential cargo space on board the vessel, known as broken stowage. Instead, McLean modified his original concept into loading just the containers, not the chassis, onto the ship; hence the designation "container ship" or "box" ship. (See also pantechnicon van and trolley and lift van.)

=== Toward standards ===
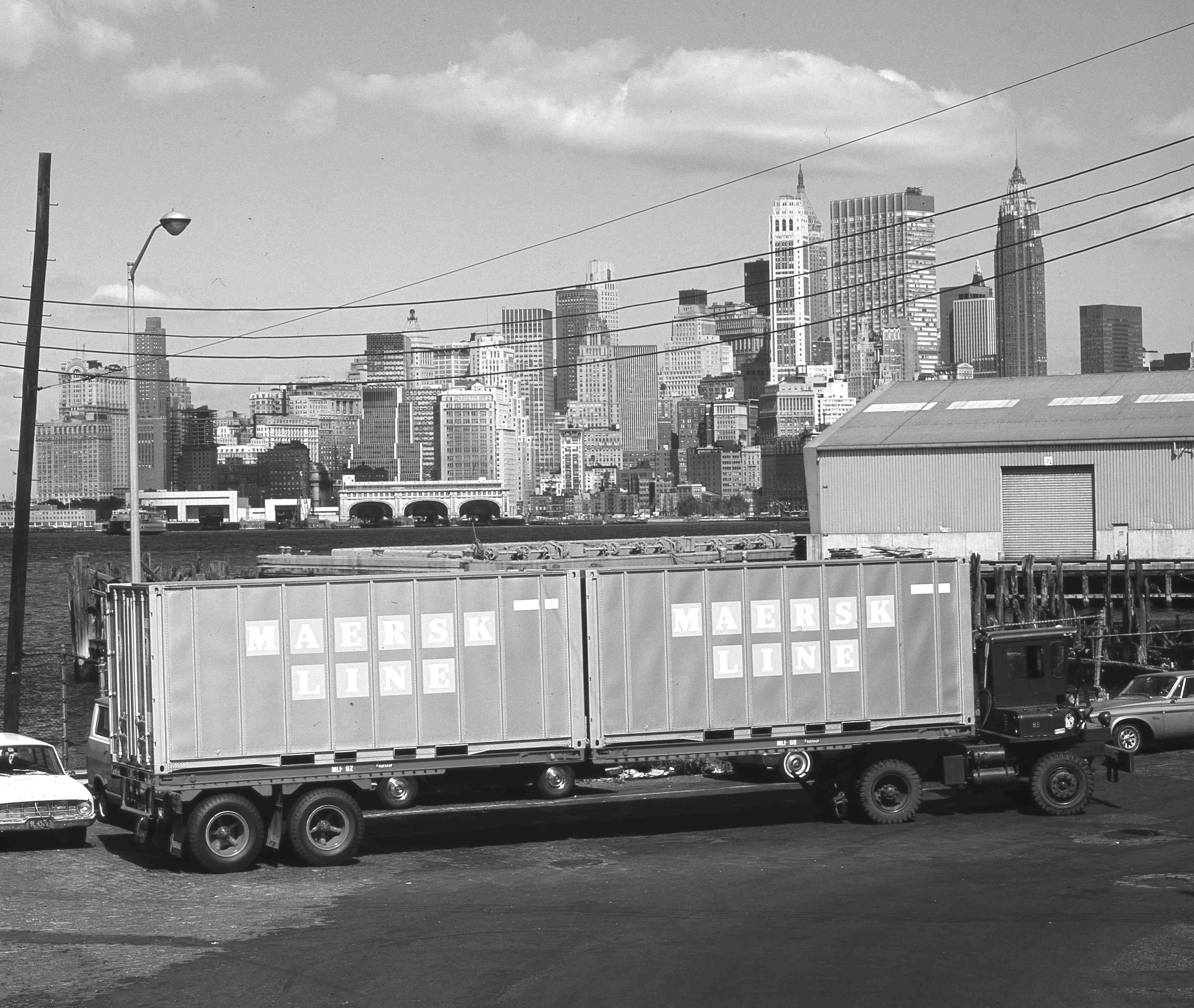
Maersk Line containers in 1975.

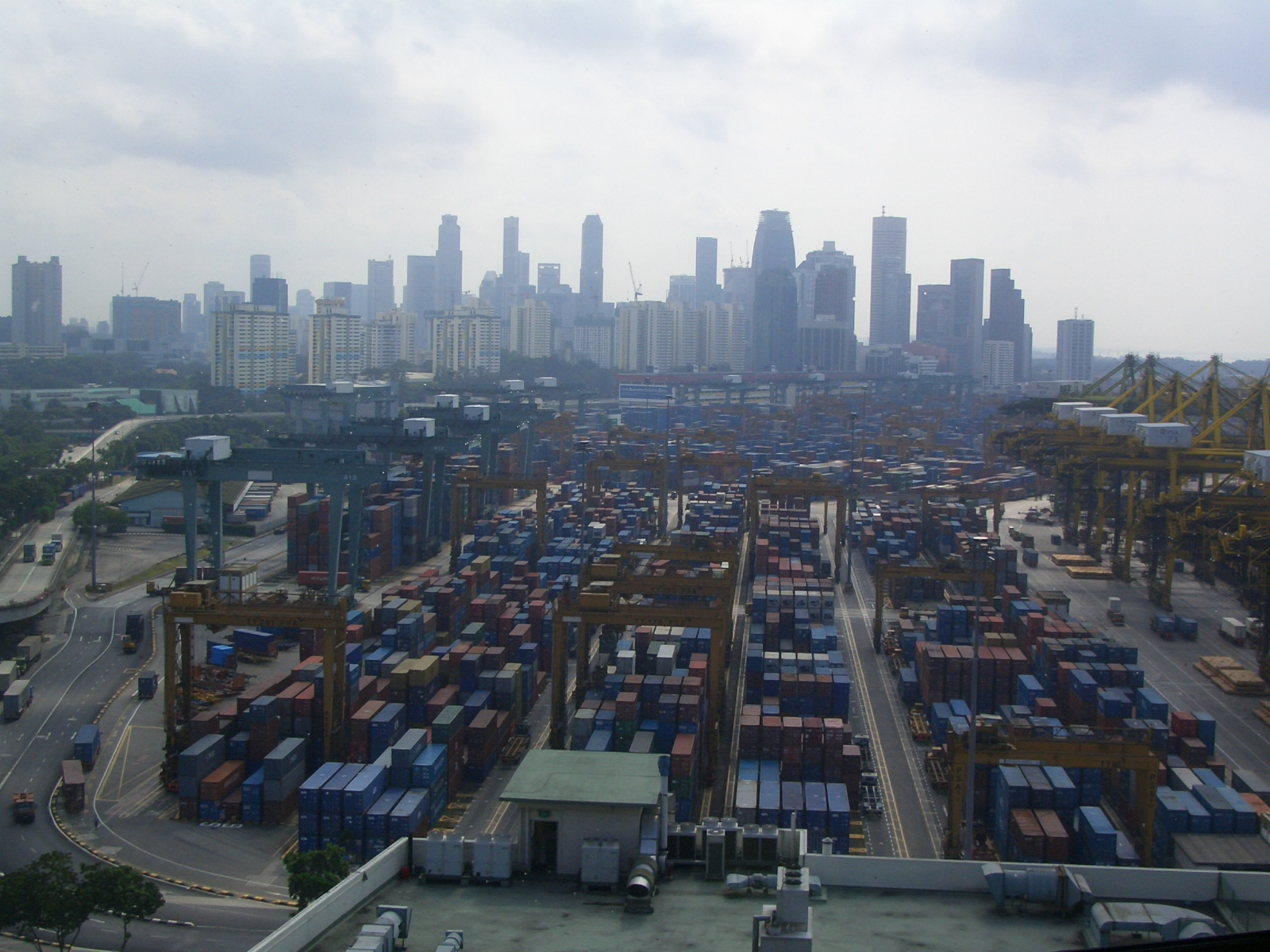
Keppel Container Terminal in Singapore

During the first 20 years of containerization, many container sizes and corner fittings were used. There were dozens of incompatible container systems in the US alone. Among the biggest operators, the Matson Navigation Company had a fleet of 24-foot (7.32 m) containers, while Sea-Land Service, Inc used 35-foot (10.67 m) containers. The standard sizes and fitting and reinforcement norms that now exist evolved out of a lengthy and complex series of compromises among international shipping companies, European railroads, US railroads, and US trucking companies. Everyone had to sacrifice something. For example, to McLean's frustration, Sea-Land's 35-foot container was not adopted as one of the standard container sizes. In the end, four important ISO (International Organization for Standardization) recommendations standardized containerization globally:

- January 1968: ISO 668 defined the terminology, dimensions and ratings.
- July 1968: R-790 defined the identification markings.
- January 1970: R-1161 made recommendations about corner fittings.
- October 1970: R-1897 set out the minimum internal dimensions of general purpose freight containers.

Based on these standards, the first TEU container ship was the Japanese Hakone Maru from shipowner NYK, which started sailing in 1968 and could carry 752 TEU containers.

In the US, containerization and other advances in shipping were impeded by the Interstate Commerce Commission (ICC), which was created in 1887 to keep railroads from using monopolist pricing and rate discrimination, but fell victim to regulatory capture. By the 1960s, ICC approval was required before any shipper could carry different items in the same vehicle or change rates. The fully integrated systems in the US today became possible only after the ICC's regulatory oversight was cut back (and abolished in 1995). Trucking and rail were deregulated in the 1970s and maritime rates were deregulated in 1984.

Double-stacked rail transport, where containers are stacked two high on railway cars, was introduced in the US. The concept was developed by Sea-Land and the Southern Pacific railroad. The first standalone double-stack container car (or single-unit 40-foot (12.2 m) COFC well car) was delivered in July 1977. The five-unit well car, the industry standard, appeared in 1981. Initially, these double-stack railway cars were deployed in regular train service. Ever since American President Lines initiated in 1984 a dedicated double-stack container train service between Los Angeles and Chicago, transport volumes increased rapidly.

=== Effects ===
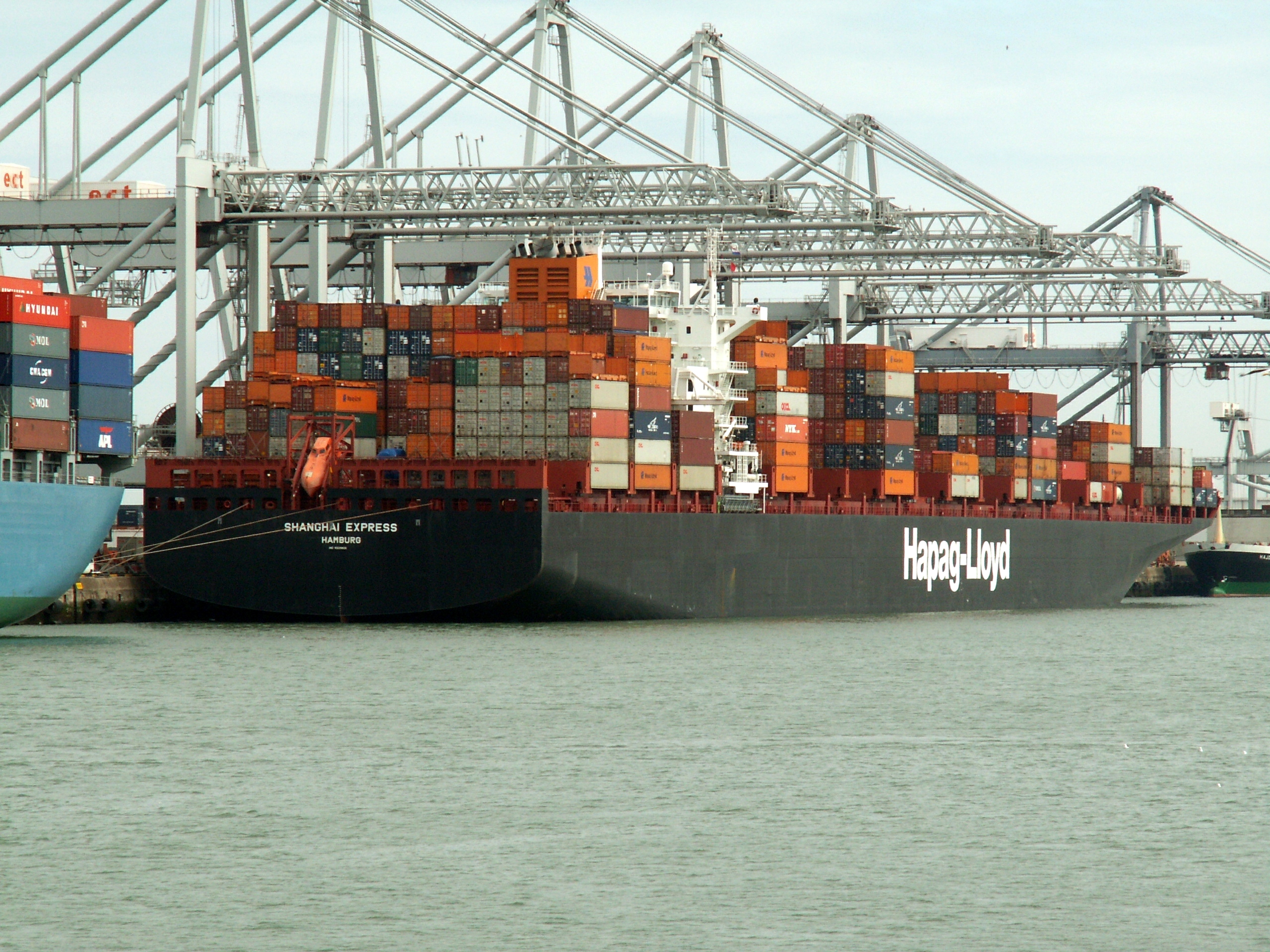
Shanghai Express, Port of Rotterdam

Containerization greatly reduced the expense of international trade and increased its speed, especially of consumer goods and commodities. It also dramatically changed the character of port cities worldwide. Prior to highly mechanized container transfers, crews of 20 to 22 longshoremen would pack individual cargoes into the hold of a ship. After containerization, large crews of longshoremen were not necessary at port facilities, and the profession changed drastically.

Meanwhile, the port facilities needed to support containerization changed. One effect was the decline of some ports and the rise of others. At the Port of San Francisco, the former piers used for loading and unloading were no longer required, but there was little room to build the vast holding lots needed for storing and sorting containers in transit between different transport modes. As a result, the Port of San Francisco essentially ceased to function as a major commercial port, but the neighboring Port of Oakland emerged as the second largest on the US West Coast. A similar fate occurred with the relationship between the ports of Manhattan and New Jersey. In the UK, the Port of London and Port of Liverpool declined in importance. Meanwhile, Britain's Port of Felixstowe and Port of Rotterdam in the Netherlands emerged as major ports.

In general, containerization caused inland ports on waterways incapable of receiving deep-draft ship traffic to decline in favor of seaports, which then built vast container terminals next to deep oceanfront harbors in lieu of the dockfront warehouses and finger piers that had formerly handled break bulk cargo. With intermodal containers, the jobs of packing, unpacking, and sorting cargoes could be performed far from the point of embarkation. Such work shifted to so-called "dry ports" and gigantic warehouses in rural inland towns, where land and labor were much cheaper than in oceanfront cities. This fundamental transformation of where warehouse work was performed freed up valuable waterfront real estate near the central business districts of port cities around the world for redevelopment and led to a plethora of waterfront revitalization projects (such as warehouse districts).

The effects of containerization rapidly spread beyond the shipping industry. Containers were quickly adopted by trucking and rail transport industries for cargo transport not involving sea transport. Manufacturing also evolved to adapt to take advantage of containers. Companies that once sent small consignments began grouping them into containers. Many cargoes are now designed to precisely fit containers. The reliability of containers made just in time manufacturing possible as component suppliers could deliver specific components on regular fixed schedules.

In 2004, global container traffic was 354 million TEUs, of which 82 percent were handled by the world's top 100 container ports.

== Twenty-first century ==
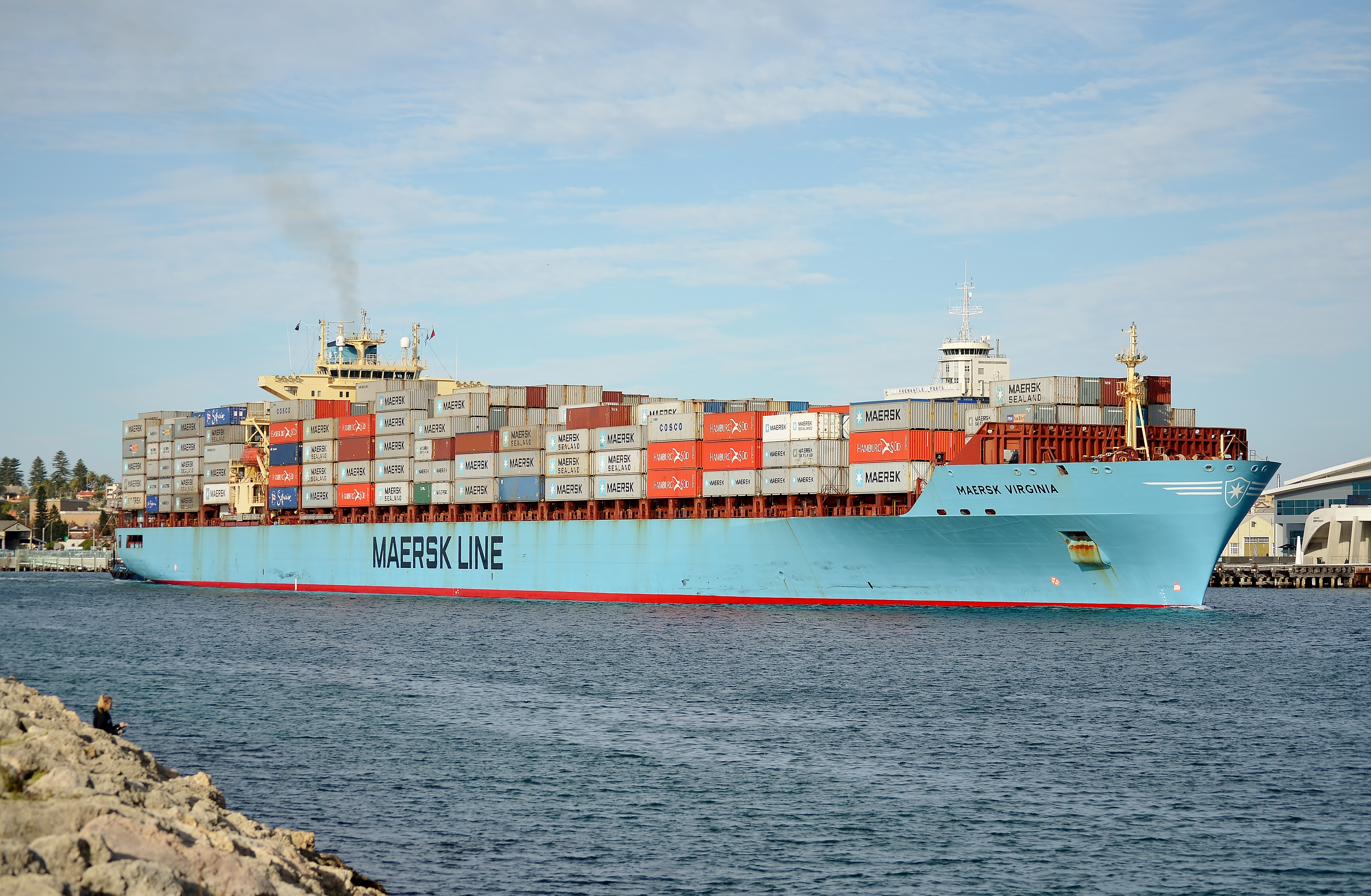
Maersk Virginia departing from Fremantle, Australia

As of 2009, approximately 90% of non-bulk cargo worldwide is moved by containers stacked on transport ships; 26% of all container transshipment is carried out in China. For example, in 2009 there were 105,976,701 transshipments in China (both international and coastal, excluding Hong Kong), 21,040,096 in Hong Kong (which is listed separately), and only 34,299,572 in the United States. In 2005, some 18 million containers made over 200 million trips per year. Some ships can carry over 14,500 twenty-foot equivalent units (TEU), such as the Emma Mærsk, 396 m (1,299 ft) long, launched in August 2006. It has been predicted that, at some point, container ships will be constrained in size only by the depth of the Straits of Malacca, one of the world's busiest shipping lanes, linking the Indian Ocean to the Pacific Ocean. This so-called Malaccamax size constrains a ship to dimensions of 470 m (1,542 ft) in length and 60 m (197 ft) wide.

Few foresaw the extent of the influence of containerization on the shipping industry. In the 1950s, Harvard University economist Benjamin Chinitz predicted that containerization would benefit New York by allowing it to ship its industrial goods more cheaply to the Southern US than other areas, but he did not anticipate that containerization might make it cheaper to import such goods from abroad. Most economic studies of containerization merely assumed that shipping companies would begin to replace older forms of transportation with containerization, but did not predict that the process of containerization itself would have a more direct influence on the choice of producers and increase the total volume of trade.

The widespread use of ISO standard containers has driven modifications in other freight-moving standards, gradually forcing removable truck bodies or swap bodies into standard sizes and shapes (though without the strength needed to be stacked), and changing completely the worldwide use of freight pallets that fit into ISO containers or into commercial vehicles.

Improved cargo security is an important benefit of containerization. Once the cargo is loaded into a container, it is not touched again until it reaches its destination. The cargo is not visible to casual viewers, and thus is less likely to be stolen. Container doors are usually sealed so that tampering is more evident. Some containers are fitted with electronic monitoring devices and can be remotely monitored for changes in air pressure, which happens when the doors are opened. This reduced thefts that had long plagued the shipping industry. Recent developments have focused on the use of intelligent logistics optimization to further enhance security.

The use of the same basic sizes of containers across the globe has lessened the problems caused by incompatible rail gauge sizes. The majority of the rail networks in the world operate on a 1,435 mm (4 ft 8 1/2 in) gauge track known as standard gauge, but some countries (such as Russia, India, Finland, and Lithuania) use broader gauges, while others in Africa and South America use narrower gauges. The use of container trains in all these countries makes transshipment between trains of different gauges easier.

Containers have become a popular way to ship private cars and other vehicles overseas using 20- or 40-foot containers. Unlike roll-on/roll-off vehicle shipping, personal effects can be loaded into the container with the vehicle, allowing easy international relocation.

In July, 2020, The Digital Container Shipping Association (DCSA), a non-profit group established to further digitalisation of container shipping technology standards, published standards for the digital exchange of operational vessel schedules (OVS).

Contrary to ocean shipping containers owned by the shippers, a persisting trend in the industry is for (new) units to be purchased by leasing companies. Leasing business accounted for 55% of new container purchases in 2017, with their box fleet growing at 6.7%, compared to units of transport operators growing by just 2.4% more TEU, said global shipping consultancy Drewry in their 'Container Census & Leasing and Equipment Insight', leading to a leased share of the global ocean container fleet reaching 54% by 2020.

In 2021, the average time to unload a container in Asia was 27 seconds, the average time in Northern Europe was 46 seconds, and the average time in North America was 76 seconds.

== Container standards ==
=== ISO standard ===
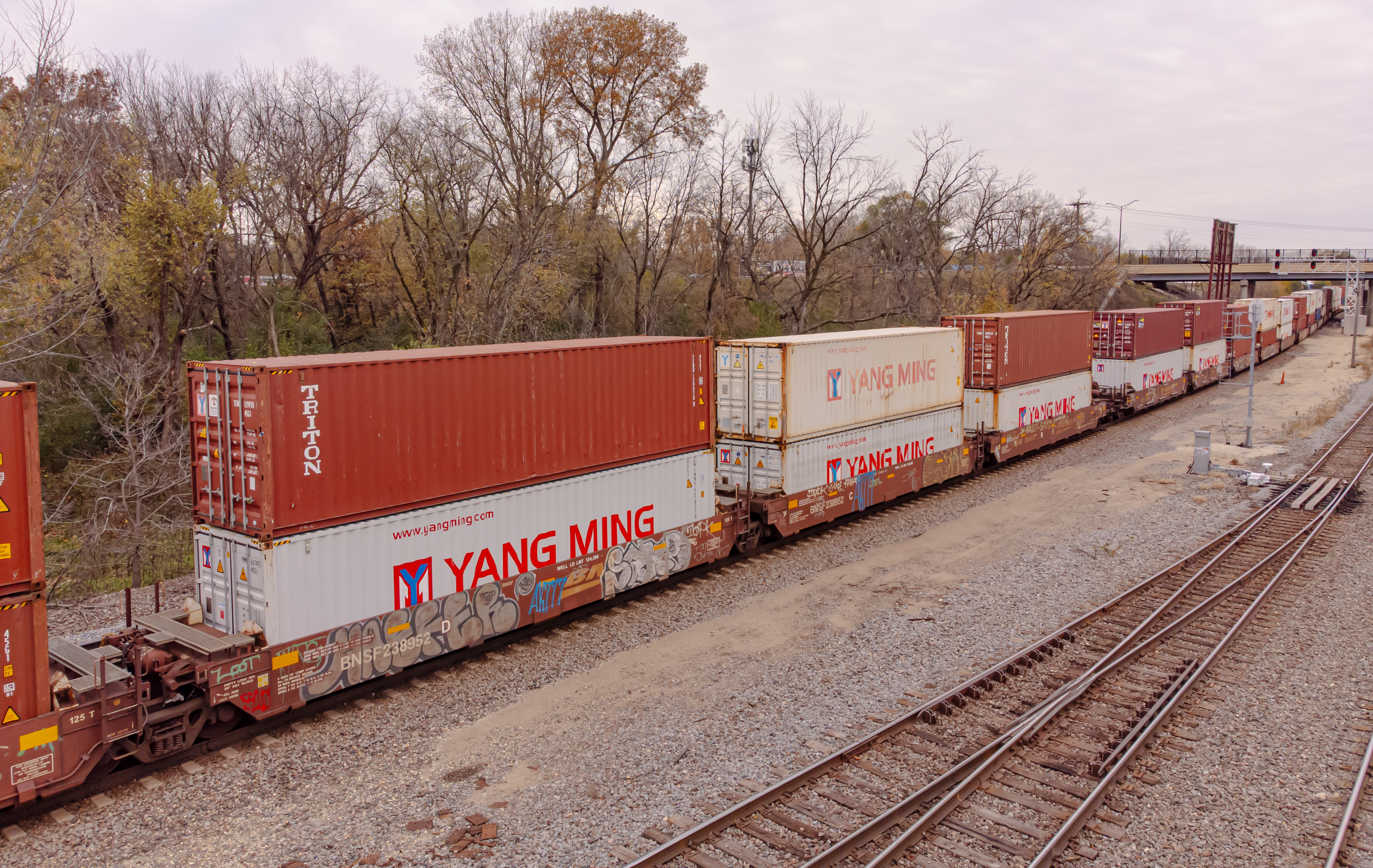
40 foot containers on the BNSF line through La Crosse

There are five common standard lengths:

- 20 ft (6.10 m)
- 40 ft (12.19 m)
- 45 ft (13.72 m)
- 48 ft (14.63 m)
- 53 ft (16.15 m)

US domestic standard containers are generally 48 ft (14.63 m) and 53 ft (16.15 m) (rail and truck). Container capacity is often expressed in twenty-foot equivalent units (TEU, or sometimes teu). An equivalent unit is a measure of containerized cargo capacity equal to one standard 20 ft (6.10 m) (length) × 8 ft (2.44 m) (width) container. As this is an approximate measure, the height of the box is not considered. For instance, the 9 ft 6 in (2.90 m) high cube and the 4 ft 3 in (1.30 m) half height 20 ft (6.10 m) containers are also called one TEU. 48' containers have been phased out over the last ten years in favor of 53' containers.

The maximum gross mass for a 20 ft (6.10 m) dry cargo container was initially set at 24,000 kg (53,000 lb), and 30,480 kg (67,200 lb)for a 40 ft (12.19 m) container (including the 9 ft 6 in or 2.90 m high cube) . Allowing for the tare mass of the container, the maximum payload mass is therefore reduced to approximately 22,000 kg (49,000 lb) for 20 ft (6.10 m), and 27,000 kg (60,000 lb) for 40 ft (12.19 m) containers.

It was increased to 30,480 kg for the 20' in 2005, then further increased to a max of 36,000 kg for all sizes by the amendment 2 (2016) of the ISO standard 668 (2013).

The original choice of 8-foot (2.44 m) height for ISO containers was made in part to suit a large proportion of railway tunnels, though some had to be modified. The current standard is eight feet six inches (2.59 m) high. With the arrival of even taller hi-cube containers at nine feet six inches (2.90 m) and double stacking rail cars, further enlargement of the rail loading gauge is proving necessary.

=== Air freight containers ===
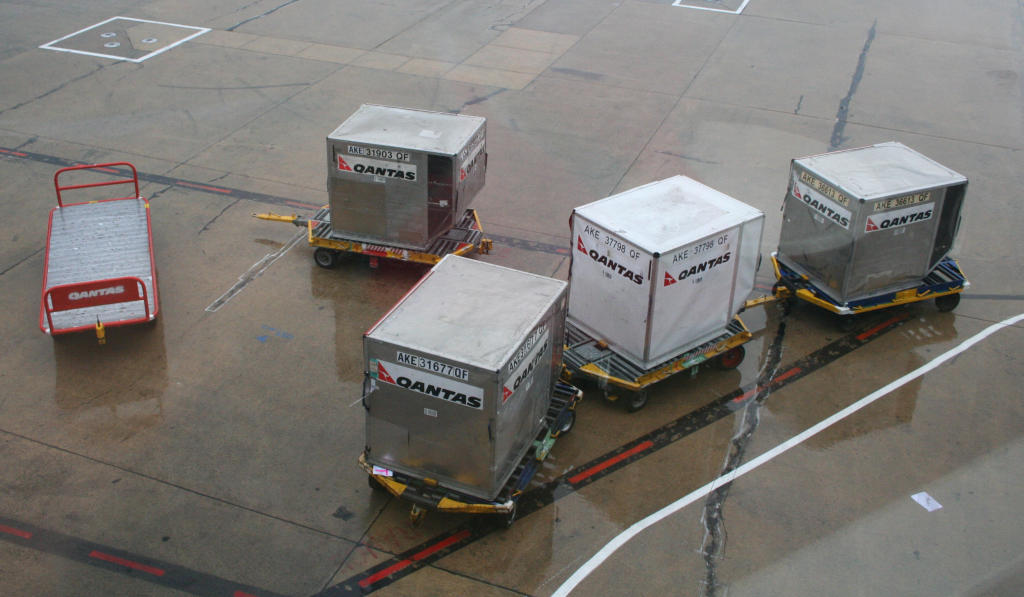
A number of LD-designation Unit Load Device containers

While major airlines use containers that are custom designed for their aircraft and associated ground handling equipment the IATA has created a set of standard aluminium container sizes of up to 11.52 m^{3} (407 cu ft) in volume.

=== Other container system standards ===
Some other container systems (in date order) are:

- (1922) NYC container
- (1924) von-Haus-zu-Haus (house to house; Germany)
- Japanese railway containers: Containers used by the Japan Freight Railway Company
- (1925) Mack
- (1927) English Railway container
- (1928) Victorian Railways – refrigerated container
- (1929) International Competition
- (1930) GWR Container
- (1931) International Chamber of Commerce
- (1933) International Container Bureau:
- (1936) South Australian Railways Wolseley break of gauge
- (1946) Queensland Railways milk container, 2,000 imperial gallons (9,100 L; 2,400 US gal), road-rail
- (1974) RACE (Australia) – slightly wider than ISO containers to fit slightly wider Australian Standard pallets
- (1994) ACTS roller containers for intermodal transport by rail and road (Central Europe)
- (1998) PODS
- (2005?) SECU (Sweden, Finland, UK) – big 95 t (93 long tons; 105 short tons) container.
- Pallet-wide containers are used in Europe and have length (45, 40 or 20 ft or 13.72, 12.19 or 6.10 m) and height like ISO-containers, but they are 2.484 m (8 ft 1 3/4 in) wide externally and 2.420 m (7 ft 11 1/4 in) internally to fit EUR-pallet better. They are meant for transport inside Europe and are often accepted in ships.
- (2014) The IPPC's Sea Container Task Force (SCTF) finalises the Cargo Transport Units Code (CTU Code).
- (2021) The National Standard of the People's Republic of China is GB/T 39919-2021 Code of practice for the plant quarantine of exit freight containers as of November 1, 2021.

== Container loading ==
=== Full container load ===
A full container load (FCL) is an ISO standard container that is loaded and unloaded under the risk and account of one shipper and one consignee. In practice, it means that the whole container is intended for one consignee. FCL container shipment tends to have lower freight rates than an equivalent weight of cargo in bulk. FCL is intended to designate a container loaded to its allowable maximum weight or volume, but FCL in practice on ocean freight does not always mean a full payload or capacity – many companies will prefer to keep a 'mostly' full container as a single container load to simplify logistics and increase security compared to sharing a container with other goods.

=== Less-than-container load ===
Less-than-container load (LCL) is a shipment that is not large enough to fill a standard cargo container. The abbreviation LCL formerly applied to "less than (railway) car load" for quantities of material from different shippers or for delivery to different destinations carried in a single railway car for efficiency. LCL freight was often sorted and redistributed into different railway cars at intermediate railway terminals en route to the final destination. It can also be defined as "a consignment of cargo which is inefficient to fill a shipping container. It is grouped with other consignments for the same destination in a container at a container freight station".

Groupage is the process of forming a full container load by combining multiple shipments for efficiency and to save costs. A groupage operator, consolidator or freight forwarder is able to undertake this role.

== Issues ==
=== Hazards ===
Containers are actively used for smuggling and trafficking illicit goods and people. Drugs, antiques, weapons, undeclared merchandise, jewellery, human beings, wildlife, counterfeit products, as well as chemical, radioactive and biological materials, are illegally transported via containers. Additionally, there are concerns about terrorists using containers to transport weapons of mass destruction (WMD). However, these concerns remain hypothetical.

There are several ways in which illicit goods are smuggled. One method involves forging documents to make a container appear as legal cargo. Another method is inserting illegal goods into a legitimate shipment, mixing legal and illegal items together. For example, in 2024, several shipments of drugs, either disguised as banana cargo or mixed with legal banana shipments, were discovered in Germany, Greece, Spain and Great Britain. Criminal groups use legitimate fruit businesses as fronts for their narcotics operations, making fruit cargo a common method for concealing drugs. Trafficking in wildlife parts, such as ivory, frequently involves altering the appearance of the goods. For instance, ivory has been known to be cut into the shape of chocolate bars or painted the colour of wood to avoid detection during X-ray inspections. Additionally, containers can be physically modified to hide illegal parcels, such as through the use of fake walls, secret compartments, hollowed-out rails, support beams and doors.

The lack of capacity at ports to inspect containers increases the likelihood of smuggled goods going undetected. In African ports, especially West Africa, where most drug routes converge, only about 2% of all containers are inspected. Similarly, European ports check just 2–10% of incoming containers, leaving the majority unscreened and creating opportunities for trafficking.

Nevertheless, there are a number of security measures in place, notably the Container Security Initiative (CSI), a post-9/11 US-led programme. This initiative aims to pre-screen high-risk cargo before it reaches US territory. One of its primary goals is to prevent the smuggling of weapons of mass destruction (WMD).

Although the programme was initiated by the United States, by 2007, some 20 countries had signed a Memorandum of Understanding with the US, leading to the implementation of CSI measures at 58 ports around the world. The CSI system includes non-intrusive pre-screening methods, such as X-ray and radiation screening, for high-risk cargo destined for the United States. As a result, more than 80% of containerised cargo bound for the United States is pre-screened.

=== Empty containers ===
Containers are intended to be used constantly, being loaded with new cargo for a new destination soon after emptied of previous cargo. This is not always possible, and in some cases, the cost of transporting an empty container to a place where it can be used is considered to be higher than the worth of the used container. Shipping lines and container leasing companies have become expert at repositioning empty containers from areas of low or no demand, such as the US West Coast, to areas of high demand, such as China. Repositioning within the port hinterland has also been the focus of recent logistics optimization work. Damaged or retired containers may be recycled in the form of shipping container architecture, or the steel content salvaged. In the summer of 2010, a worldwide shortage of containers developed as shipping increased after the recession, while new container production had largely ceased.

=== Loss at sea ===
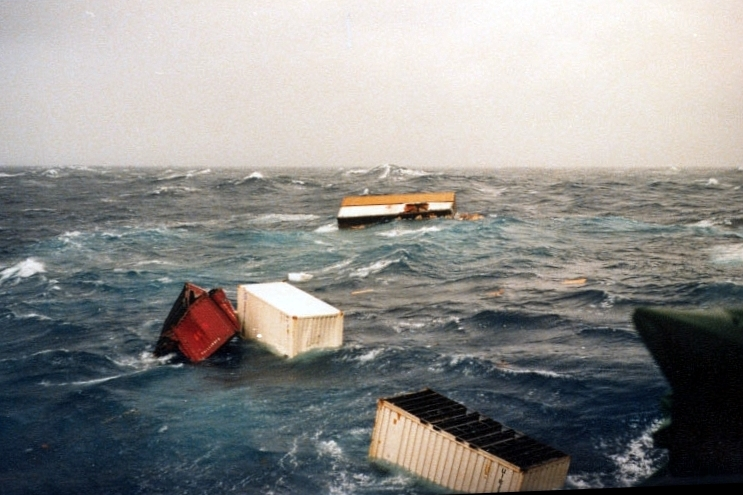
In a hurricane containers falling overboard – North Atlantic in winter 1980

Containers occasionally fall from ships, usually during storms. According to media sources, between 2,000 and 10,000 containers are lost at sea each year. The World Shipping Council states in a survey among freight companies that this claim is grossly excessive and calculated an average of 350 containers to be lost at sea each year, or 675 if including catastrophic events. For instance, on November 30, 2006, a container washed ashore on the Outer Banks of North Carolina, along with thousands of bags of its cargo of Doritos Chips. Containers lost in rough waters are smashed by cargo and waves, and often sink quickly. Although not all containers sink, they seldom float very high out of the water, making them a shipping hazard that is difficult to detect. Freight from lost containers has provided oceanographers with unexpected opportunities to track global ocean currents, notably a cargo of Friendly Floatees.

In 2007 the International Chamber of Shipping and the World Shipping Council began work on a code of practice for container storage, including crew training on parametric rolling, safer stacking, the marking of containers, and security for above-deck cargo in heavy swell.

In 2011, the MV Rena ran aground off the coast of New Zealand. As the ship listed, some containers were lost, while others were held on board at a precarious angle.

=== Trade union challenges ===
Some of the biggest battles in the container revolution were waged in Washington, D.C.. Intermodal shipping got a huge boost in the early 1970s, when carriers won permission to quote combined rail-ocean rates. Later, non-vessel-operating common carriers won a long court battle with a US Supreme Court decision against contracts that attempted to require that union labor be used for stuffing and stripping containers at off-pier locations.

=== As pest vector ===
Containers are often infested with pests. Pest introductions are significantly clustered around ports, and containers are a common source of such successful pest transfers. The IPPC Sea Container Task Force (SCTF) promulgates the Cargo Transport Units Code (CTU), prescribed pesticides and other standards (see § Other container system standards) and recommendations for use in container decontamination, inspection and quarantine. The SCTF also provides the English translation of the National Standard of China (GB/T 39919-2021).

== Other uses for containers ==
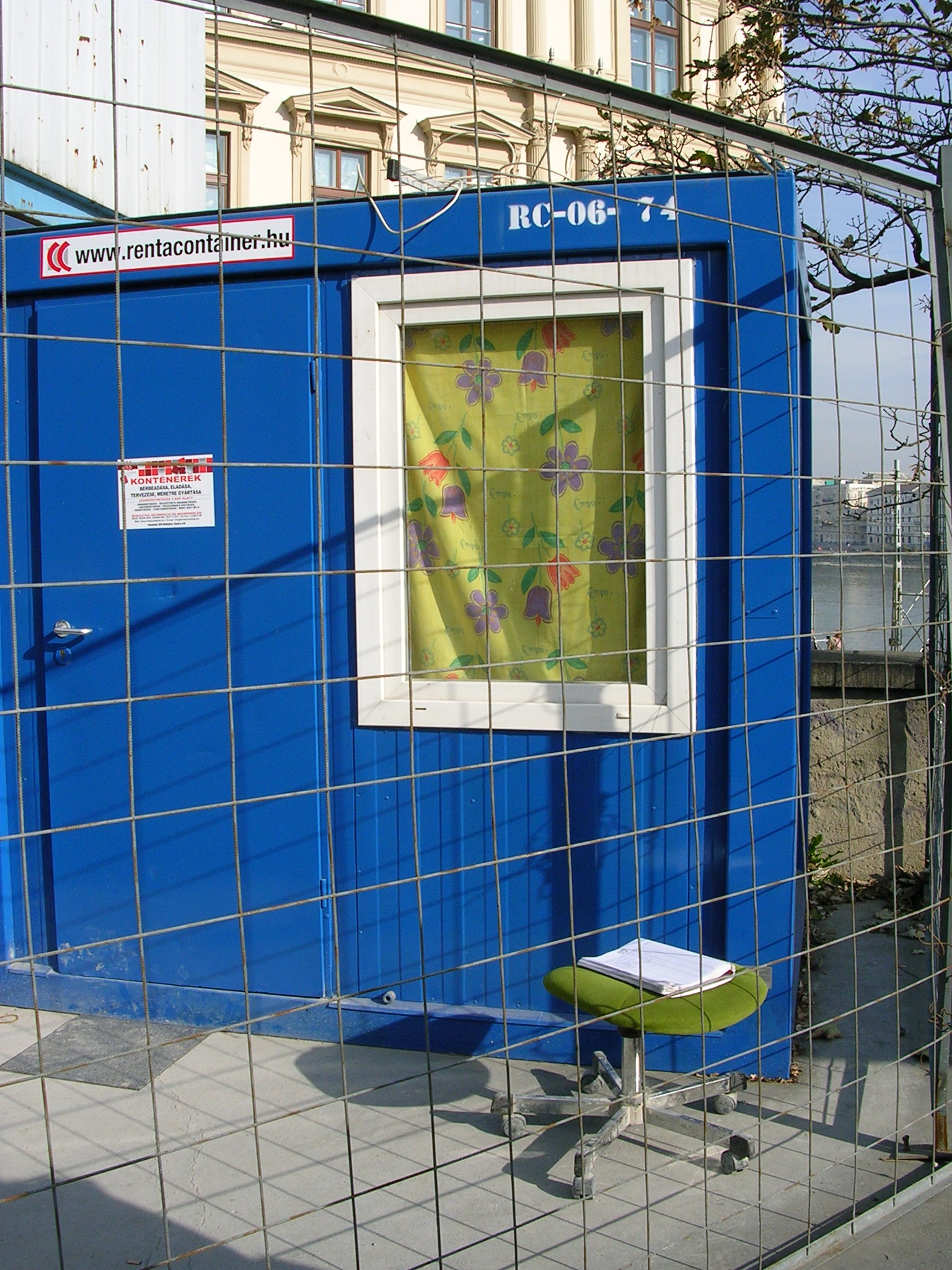
A converted container used as an office at a building site

Shipping container architecture is the use of containers as the basis for housing and other functional buildings for people, either as temporary or a permanent housing, and either as a main building or as a cabin or as a workshop. Containers can also be used as sheds or storage areas in industry and commerce.

Tempo Housing in Amsterdam stacks containers for individual housing units.

Containers are also beginning to be used to house computer data centers, although these are normally specialized containers.

There is now a high demand for containers to be converted in the domestic market to serve specific purposes. As a result, a number of container-specific accessories have become available for a variety of applications, such as racking for archiving, lining, heating, lighting, powerpoints to create purpose-built secure offices, canteens and drying rooms, condensation control for furniture storage, and ramps for storage of heavier objects. Containers are also converted to provide equipment enclosures, pop-up cafes, exhibition stands, security huts and more.

Public containerised transport is the concept, not yet implemented, of modifying motor vehicles to serve as personal containers in non-road passenger transport.

The ACTS roller container standards have become the basis of containerized firefighting equipment throughout Europe.

Containers have also been used for weapon systems, such as the Russian Club-K, which allow the conversion of an ordinary container system into a missile boat, capable of attacking surface and ground targets, and the CWS (Containerized Weapon System) developed for the US Army that allow for the rapid deployment of a remote controlled machine gun post from a container.

== BBC tracking project ==
On September 5, 2008, the BBC embarked on a year-long project to study international trade and globalization by tracking a shipping container on its journey around the world.

== See also ==
- 2000s energy crisis
- Conflat
- Container terminal design process
- Double-stack rail transport
- Henry Robinson Palmer described an early principle of containerization.
- Inter-box connector
- Intermodal container
- List of cargo types
- List of world's busiest container ports
- Little Eaton Gangway 1798
- Multimodal transport
- NYC container 1922
- Shipping portal
- Stowage plan for container ships
- Tanktainers
- Unit load

== Bibliography ==
- Broeze, Frank (2002). The Globalisation of the Oceans: Containerisation from the 1950s to the Present. Research in Maritime History, issue 23. St. John's, Newfoundland: International Maritime Economic History Association. ISBN 0-9730073-3-8. ISSN 1188-3928. – a history of containerization in the second half of the twentieth century
- Cudahy, Brian J. (2006). Box Boats: How Container Ships Changed the World. New York: Fordham University Press. ISBN 0-8232-2568-2. – how container ships changed the world
- Donovan, Arthur; Bonney, Joseph (2006). The Box that Changed the World: Fifty Years of Container Shipping – an Illustrated History. East Windsor, NJ: Commonwealth Business Media. ISBN 1-891131-95-8.
- George, Rose (2013). Ninety Percent of Everything: Inside Shipping, the Invisible Industry That Puts Clothes on Your Back, Gas in Your Car, and Food on Your Plate. New York: Metropolitan Books / Henry Holt and Co. ISBN 978-0-8050-9263-9.
- Gibson, William (2007). Spook Country. New York: G.P. Putnam's Sons. ISBN 978-0-399-15430-0. – novel set in U.S., in which mystery surrounding a containerized shipment serves as the MacGuffin
- Levinson, Marc (2006). "(See Chapter 1 here)". The Box: How the Shipping Container Made the World Smaller and the World Economy Bigger. Princeton, NJ: Princeton University Press. ISBN 0-691-12324-1. Archived from the original on 2013-01-22.
- ——————— (2016). The Box: How the Shipping Container Made the World Smaller and the World Economy Bigger (2nd ed.). Princeton, NJ: Princeton University Press. ISBN 978-1-4008-8075-1. JSTOR j.ctvcszztg.
- Lewandowski, Krzysztof (2024). Modeling the Process of the Development of Loading Units. Cambridge Scholars Publishing. ISBN 103640000X.
- Pollak, Richard (2004). The Colombo Bay: At Sea in a Dangerous Universe. New York: Simon & Schuster. ISBN 0-7432-0073-X.
- Taggart, Stewart (October 1, 1999). "The 20-Ton Packet". Wired. ISSN 1078-3148.
- ASTM D 5728 Standard Practice for Securement of Cargo in Intermodal and Unimodal Surface Transport
- "Container Dimensions and Capacity". Export 911. Archived from the original on 2003-06-04.
- "Container Handbook". German Insurance Association. 2006.
- "Emergency Response Guidebook" (PDF). Transport Canada, the U.S. Department of Transportation, and the Secretariat of Communications and Transport of Mexico. 2004. Archived from the original (PDF) on 2006-02-08. – a guidebook for first responders during the initial phase of a dangerous goods/hazardous materials incident
- "Introduction to Container Transportation". Archived from the original on 2010-09-06. – A good pictorial introduction to containers
- "Port Industry Statistics". American Association of Port Authorities.
- "Transport Information Service: containers". German Insurance Association. – types, inspection, climate, stowage, securing, capacity
