= GWR Container =

British railway company's goods containers

Between WWI and WWII, the Great Western Railway developed the use of containers that could be packed and locked at a client's premises, taken by lorry to a station, then carried by train and again by lorry to the final destination. Using these containers, they offered a door-to-door removals service, providing a team to pack the furniture, and a discount on fares to the destination. Some containers could carry up to 72 bicycles. Insulated containers, cooled by boxes of ice, were used to transport flower bulbs and other perishable items.

Originally such containers were carried on general-purpose flat trucks and wagons, but from 1931 the GWR built or converted a number of special purpose flat-bedded wagons, provided with chains for securing the load. They were called by the telegraphic code Conflat, and most of them were fitted with vacuum brakes.

In 1930 the railway introduced 100 containers primarily for building materials.

- External size: 7 ft 4 in × 4 ft 4 1/2 in (2,235 mm × 1,334 mm) height 1 ft 6 1/2 in (470 mm)
- Internal size: 7 ft 0 in × 4 ft 0 in (2,134 mm × 1,219 mm) height 1 ft 3 in (381 mm)
- Capacity: 1 long ton 10 cwt (3,400 lb or 1.5 t), tare weight 6 long cwt (700 lb or 300 kg)

== See also ==
- Containerization
- Intermodal container

== Sources ==
- Atkins, A. G.; Beard, W.; Hyde, D. J.; and Tourret, R. (1975). A History of GWR Goods Wagons. Vol. 1: General. London: David & Charles. ISBN 0715365320.
- Atkins, A. G.; Beard, W.; Hyde, D. J.; and Tourret, R. (1976). A History of GWR Goods Wagons. Vol. 2: Wagon Types in Detail. London: David & Charles. ISBN 0715372904.
- Russell, Janet K. L. (1983). G. W. R. Company Servants. Upper Bucklebury, Berks.: Wild Swan Publications. ISBN 0906867185.
- "NEW RAILWAY CONTAINER". Sydney Morning Herald. National Library of Australia. 8 September 1930. p. 11.
