= Condor (train) =

British fast containerised freight train service

The Condor was an overnight fast freight train service operated by British Railways between London and Glasgow from 1959 until 1965 with all freight carried in containers. The name was derived from 'CONtainers DOoR-to-Door'.

== Modernisation of British Railways ==
Following the 1955 Modernisation Plan, British Railways embarked on a series of modernisation plans in all areas of operation, including freight.

Faster freight services had been a goal as far back as the end of World War I, with fast, overnight services between major marshalling yards. 'Liner' or trunked services were scheduled long-haul freight services, between regional freight depots, usually run overnight. If a wagon load was in the marshalling yard that day, it could have a guaranteed next-day arrival at a similar yard, even travelling the length of the country. Part of the goal was to reduce marshalling for the railway company, who wished to concentrate freight marshalling at fewer, larger and better equipped marshalling yards. In 1928, the LNER had introduced the Green Arrow service.

By the 1950s, there were additional target goals: still a faster freight service to be more attractive than the growing competition from road haulage, but mostly a reduction in operating costs by reducing the manual effort needed in handling freight. A key part of this was to be containerisation, replacing the network of railway goods sheds and manual loading in and out of vans, by pre-loaded containers from the customer factories loaded onto railway wagons by mechanical cranes. There would also be a centralisation of freight services: as well as the increasing development of and investment in marshalling yards, (Note: Although this turned out to be short-lived, and they underwent massive cutbacks or closures in the 1980s.) as much freight as possible would become block trains, where a single rake of freight wagons shuttled continuously between two large depots, without needing to stop for shunting operations. Containers were key to this: road haulage would provide local flexibility to move the loads to and from the customer warehouses and the rail operation would concentrate on rapid transfers between a handful of large depots.

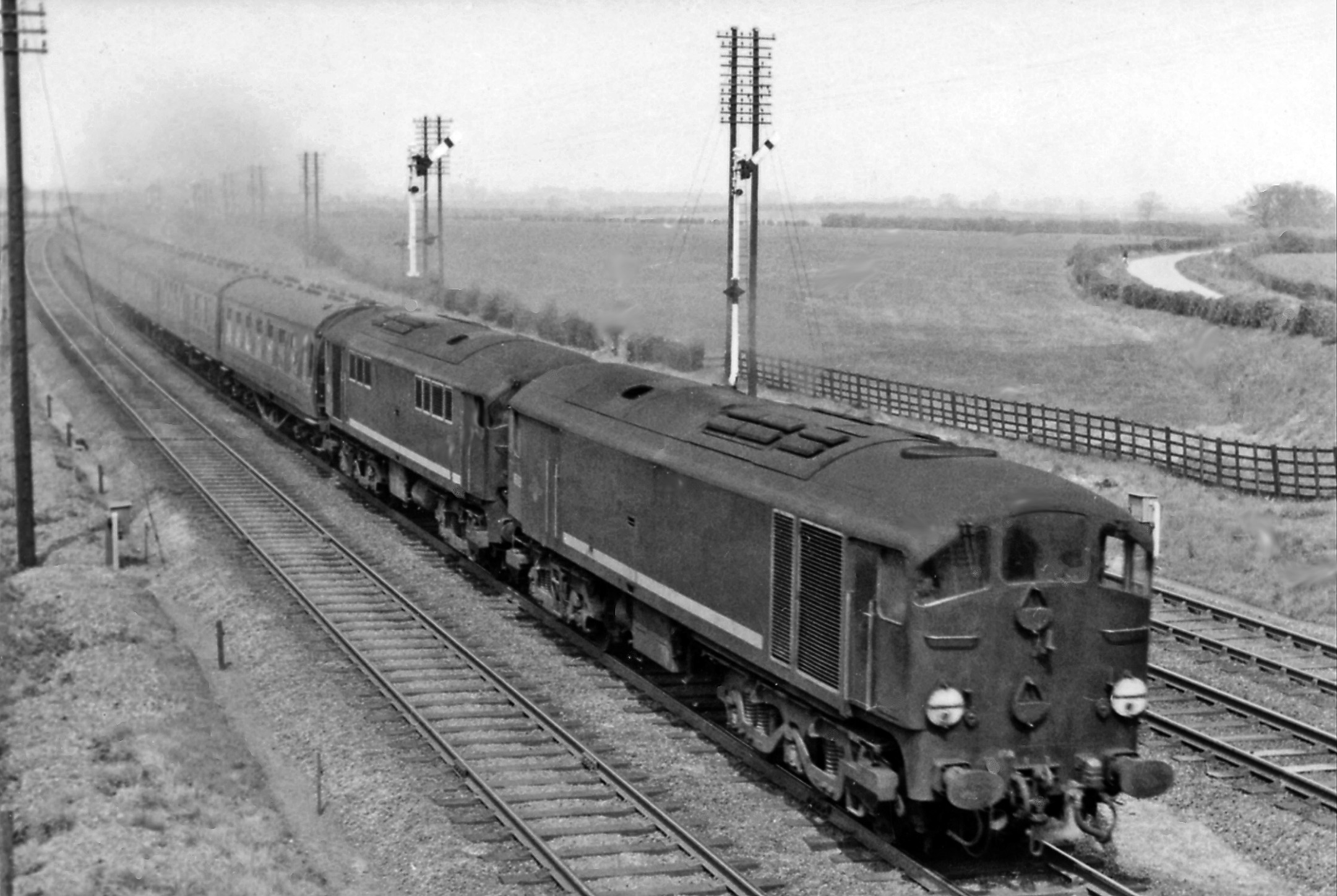
A pair of the pre-1961 Metro-Vick locomotives on a passenger service in 1960

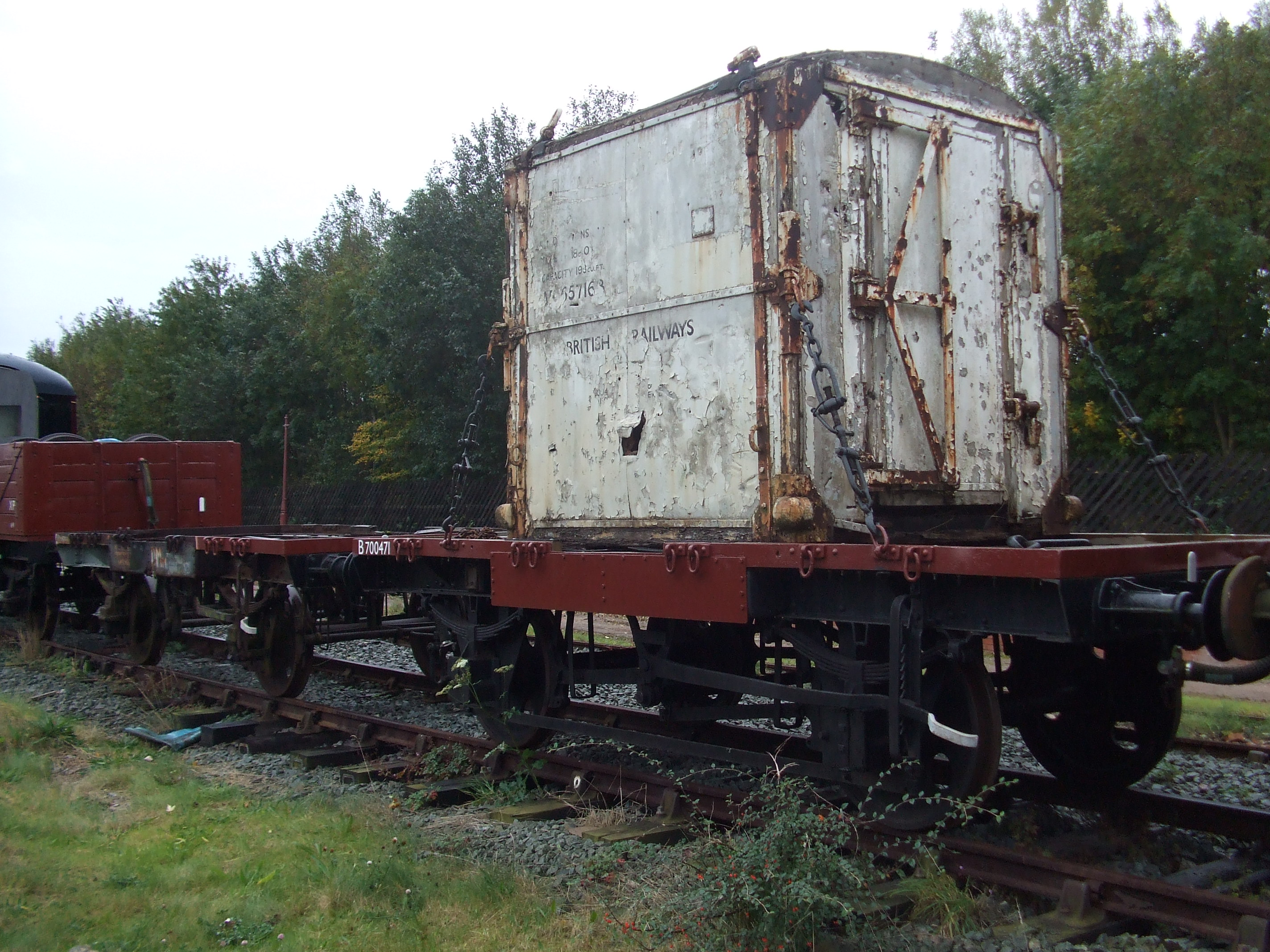
Conflat flat wagon

The 'container' to be used for this traffic was not the modern familiar stackable intermodal container or TEU, but a much earlier version, the railway conflat. These were smaller, lighter, wooden containers which resembled a demounted railway wagon body, included the curved roof. They dated from the 1920s in design and were sized for lifting by the mobile cranes of the day. The conflat wagons were four-wheeled, vacuum-braked, and could carry either one Type B container or two smaller Type A.

== Condor ==
The Condor was the exemplar service for this new containerised operation. A single route would operate, linking the manufacturing base of Glasgow with the consumers of central London. Return traffic was largely imported raw materials, supplied from London's docks. The route was from Hendon on the Midland Main Line in North London to Gushetfaulds freight depot, near Glasgow South Side railway station running via Leeds and the Settle and Carlisle line.

Each Condor train was of 27 four-wheeled conflats, of a new design with roller bearing axles to allow the fastest running and without the risk of stopping for a 'hot box'. Each could carry one or two containers, the containers carrying up to 8 long tons (9.0 short tons; 8.1 t). The Conflats for Condor were heavier at 35.5 long tons (39.8 short tons; 36.1 t) than earlier examples and were later given their own TOPS code of FC. (Note: The 11-long-ton (12.3-short-ton; 11.2 t) Conflat A was TOPS coded as FA, the 25.5 long tons (28.6 short tons; 25.9 t) Conflat AS as FB.) The train's gross weight could be up to 550 long tons (620 short tons; 560 t). The cost of hiring a container in 1962 was £16 or £18, depending on size, and this included road pickup and delivery by British Road Services lorries, inside Greater London or within 10 miles (16 km) of Glasgow. As well as the fixed formation of 27 conflat wagons, a specific pool of containers was dedicated to the service. Every wagon on the train always ran carrying a container, regardless of direction. If 27 loads were not available to fill every container, the surplus would be carried empty - this was to ensure a good supply of empty containers at both ends of the service to enable rapid loading of goods inbound from customers.

The service ran daily, one each way, and ran overnight to obtain the clearest running. Both left almost simultaneously, after 7 pm and would arrive some time before 6 am. The 10 hour long service required a very brief, two minute, stop at Carlisle, (Note: The new Kingmoor marshalling yard was not opened until 1962.) at the change of a crew shift, rather than any limitation of the train.

== Haulage ==
The first Condor services were hauled by pairs of the newly built Metro-Vick Type 2 Co-Bo locomotives, later known as the class 28. These were 1,200 bhp (890 kW) locomotives, used in pairs. Pairs were needed as the dieselisation process was still new to Britain and the more powerful Type 4 locomotives were in short supply and in demand for passenger services. The class 28 had a relatively high tractive effort for a Type 2 loco, of 50,000 lbf (220 kN) compared to 42,000 lbf (190 kN) for the Sulzer Type 2. They also had five driven axles, rather than four, giving good traction without wheelslip. The Metro-Vicks were fitted for multiple working, so although two locos were needed, there was only one crew. (Note: Although a crew change was still needed partway, owing to the length of the rostered turn.) Their 'Red Circle' connection system of multiple working was not widely used on BR, compared to the contemporary 'Blue Star', and few other classes used it; hence the Metro-Vicks were used throughout. The Condor service was well-suited to the Metro-Vicks, as the night working allowed a relatively constant power output, with little other traffic to cause signals checks.

Their Crossley two-stroke engines were unreliable though, and prone to black smoke when throttling up. A further, more unusual, problem with the Metro-Vicks was with their front windscreens. These wrapped around the corners of the cab, to give a better view to the sides, but the engine's vibration could be enough to make the glass panes fall out of their frames. When cracking problems with their crankcases became evident after a few years, the locomotives were withdrawn from service and the engines rebuilt by Crossley.

If a locomotive failed, it was replaced by another, and often this would be a Sulzer Type 2 as the Metro-Vicks were only stabled at the ends of the service, not in between. In rare cases, a steam locomotive might be all that was available, usually a Black 5. In either case there could be no multiple working and an extra crew was required.

== In service ==
=== 1959 ===
The first Condor services began in the Spring of 1959. The service was not an immediate success. By August 1959, the formation had been cut in half, now being hauled by only a single locomotive. Traffic grew though and within a year it was running at full traffic capacity.

=== 1961 ===
In 1961, the unreliable Metro-Vicks were all withdrawn temporarily for their engines to be refurbished by the makers, Crossley, in the hope of avoiding their problems. A further problem had developed, that of crankcase cracking in one particular corner. Derby-Sulzer Type 2s, later renumbered as the Class 24s, took over the Condor, with LMS Black Fives serving as a stopgap till a sufficient number of Type 2s were available.

When the Class 28s returned, they had also had their distinctive wrap-around windshields replaced with flat glass, which no longer tended to fall out. The class was redeployed to the Barrow depot, where they worked out the rest of their short careers mostly on passenger services until they were all withdrawn by 1968. (Note: One example, D5705, survived and is now preserved.)

=== 1963 ===
In 1963 an additional service from Birmingham to Glasgow was added. This ran from Aston in Birmingham to Glasgow. Class 24s were the usual motive power from its introduction on 17 January 1963, when D5082 hauled the Down train and D5083 the up train, until replaced by the first Freightliner service in 1965.

After the Class 28s and Class 24s, the Condor was hauled by a single Type 4 locomotive.

=== Freightliner ===
Richard Beeching's 1963 report The Reshaping of British Railways is better known for the cuts it imposed on the branch line network, but it also advocated a shift in almost all freight traffic to replace wagonload traffic with container services. However these containers would be the newly popular stackable rectangular containers, rather than the older railway standard containers, as used by Condor.

In the mid-1960s, BR's emphasis shifted to the new Freightliner service. Beeching's plan was for a national network of 55 container depots and by 1968, 17 of these were in operation, including Gushetfauld. Condor was withdrawn in 1965. Most of the early adopters were existing customers, sending bulk trainload cargoes, although now packed into containers. An important one was Ford, who used this to integrate car production across Europe, shipping bodyshells for final assembly across the Channel, by the Dover–Dunkerque train ferry. The introduction of the new TOPS computer system also allowed all operations to be tracked as registered freight, between all depots.

== Headboard ==
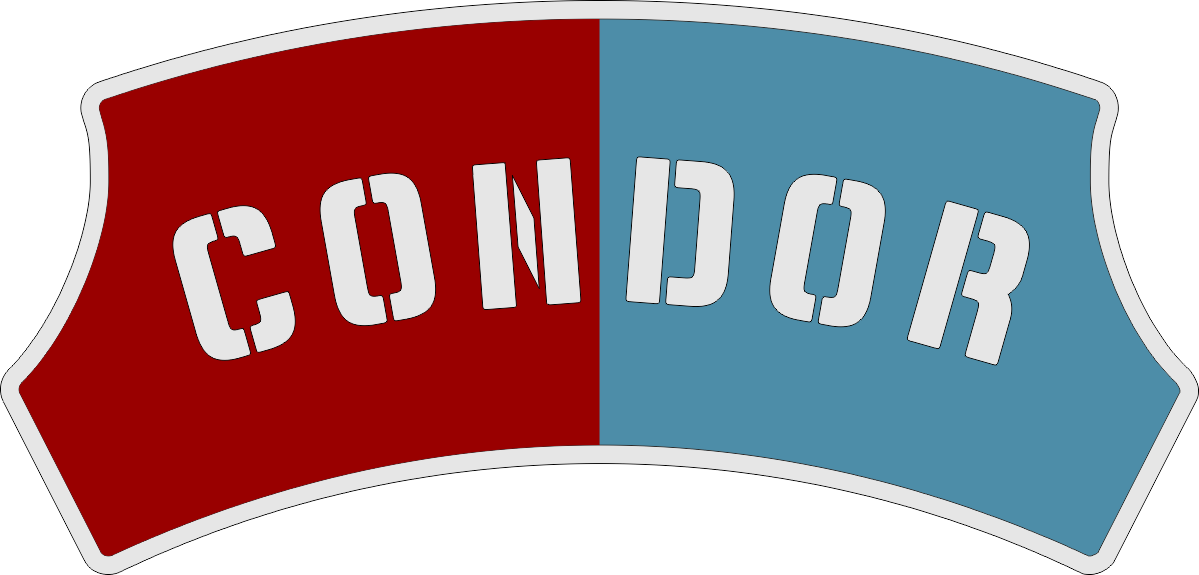
Condor headboard

The headboard was a British Railways Type 6. It was unique in two aspects: the backplate colour was in two colours, and the text was in a 'stencil' typeface, with vertical breaks in each letter. The two colours were maroon (left) for the London Midland Region and pale blue for the Scottish Region.

== In popular culture ==
Railway artist Terence Cuneo produced a poster, Night Freight for BR(M), showing a Metro-Vick hauled Condor crossing a Black 5 steam loco, outside a coaling depot.
