= NYC container =

The New York Central Rail Road introduced a container system in 1922.

== Specifications ==
Details include:

- Width: 9 ft (2,743 mm)
- Length: 7 ft (2,134 mm)
- Height: 6 ft 4 in (1,930 mm)
- Tare weight 9,000 lb (4,080 kg)

== See also ==
- Containerization
- Intermodal container
- Shipping container
