= SECU (container) =

SECU, Stora Enso Cargo Unit, is a type of intermodal container (shipping container) built to transport bulk cargo like paper on railway and ship. They were invented and used by Stora Enso (forest and paper company). The ports used are mainly in production countries like Finland (Kotka, Oulu) and Sweden (Gothenburg) and in consumer countries Belgium (Zeebrugge), UK (Tilbury, Immingham) and Germany (Lübeck).

A SECU looks like a larger standard 40-foot ISO Container, measuring 13.8×3.6×4.375 m (45.28×11.81×14.35 ft) with a net weight of 80 metric tons (79 long tons; 88 short tons) of cargo. By contrast a 40-foot container is 12.2×2.7×2.4 m (40.0×8.9×7.9 ft) and can carry 26.5 metric tons (26.1 long tons; 29.2 short tons) of cargo. The benefit is that their larger capacity reduces the number of containers needed, and therefore their handling cost. The drawback is that special care is needed to handle them.

A SECU is too big and heavy to be transported by road (ISO-Containers are designed to fit roads), and instead they are transported only by railway and ship. A special vehicle or crane is used to load and unload them, and special railcars are also needed. They can be transported on truck ferries, but do not fit normal container ships.

== Dimensions ==
The Stora Enso Cargo Unit has fixed legs so that the inner floor has a height of 874 mm (34.4 in) for an unloaded container - the basic container (without legs) has outer dimensions of 3,600 mm (11 ft 10 in) squared.

Dimension	External		Internal		Door Opening	
Length	13,800 mm	45 ft 3 1/4 in	13,576 mm	44 ft 6 1/2 in		
Width	3,600 mm	11 ft 9 3/4 in	3,430 mm	11 ft 3 in	3,430 mm	11 ft 3 in
Height	4,375 mm	14 ft 4 1/4 in	3,437 mm	11 ft 3 1/4 in	3,393 mm	11 ft 1 1/2 in

== See also ==
- Containerization
- Intermodal container
