= World Shipping Council =

The World Shipping Council (WSC) is the primary industry trade association representing the international liner shipping industry, which offers regularly scheduled service on fixed schedules. Most liner carriers are container shipping lines. The WSC is headquartered in Washington, D.C., and is led by Chief Executive John W. Butler, former general counsel for the WSC and former President of the Maritime Administrative Bar Association. The WSC also has branches located internationally in Brussels and Singapore, allowing for a global reach.

== Membership ==
WSC membership includes 20 member companies from all around the globe, who in total, account for roughly 90% of global liner shipping capacity. Currently, of the 20 member companies, 16 companies have representation on the WSC's board. As of 2021, the current co-chairs of the board are Rolf Habben Jenson of Hapag-Lloyd AG and Jeremy Nixon of Ocean Network Express (ONE).

== Activities ==
The council was formed in 2000 to lobby the U.S. government regarding container and cargo shipping regulation, generally in favor of improved maritime security coupled with deregulation of ports and transport routes. Since that time, WSC has grown into an international organization representing the industry globally. WSC has developed draft standards on vessel air emissions and pollution, improvements to seaport customs procedures and international standards for container design and handling. Another key aspect of the WSC is its agenda to maintain environmentally friendly practices in liner shipping. In 2021, WSC worked with other key players in the industry, to begin a plan to make liner shipping carbon neutral in the upcoming years with the goal of being carbon free for the long-term.
