= Trolley and lift van =

Horse-drawn system for moving goods

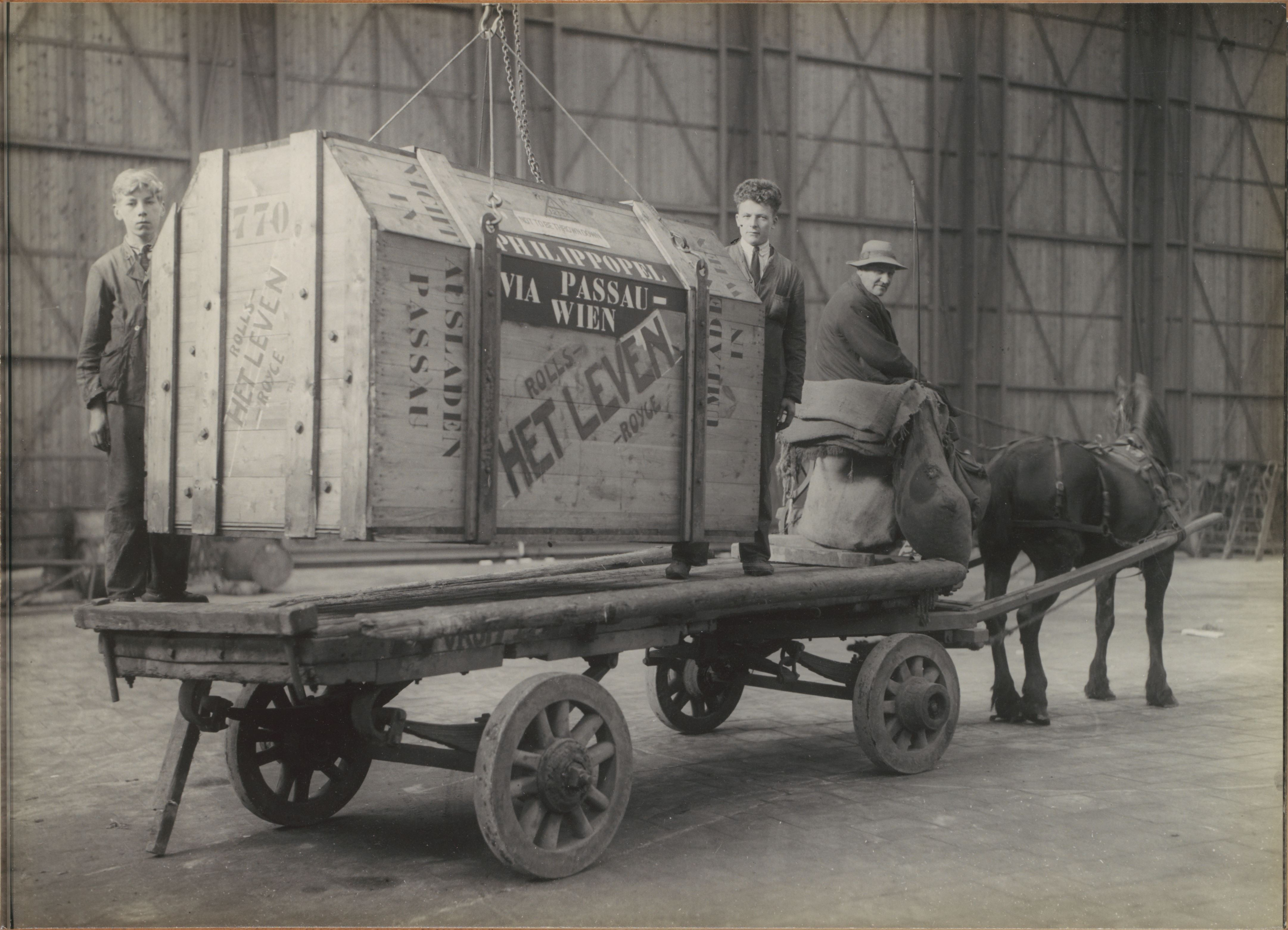
Lift van on trolley, 1925

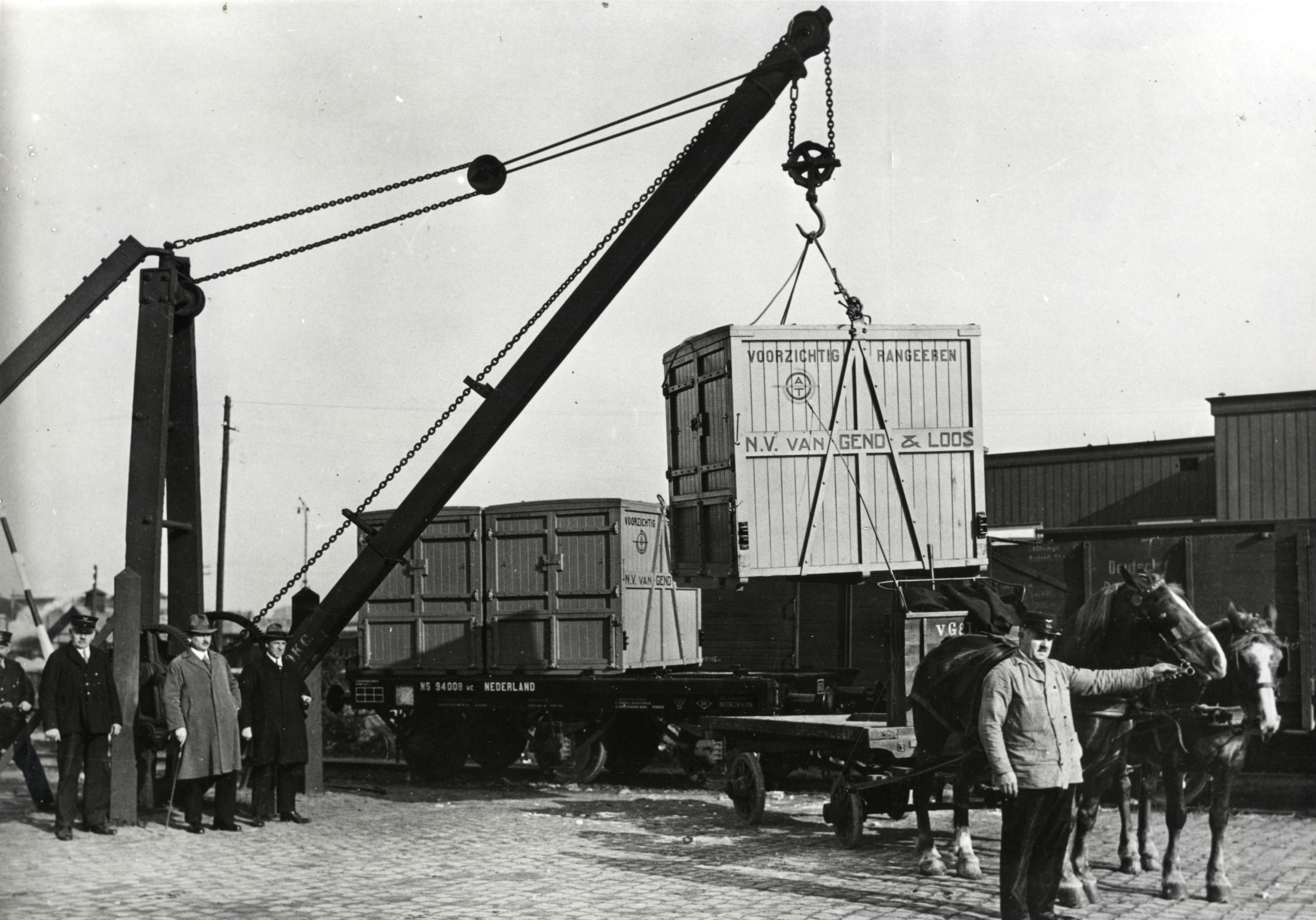
Crane loading a container onto horse-drawn trolley (1925-1935)

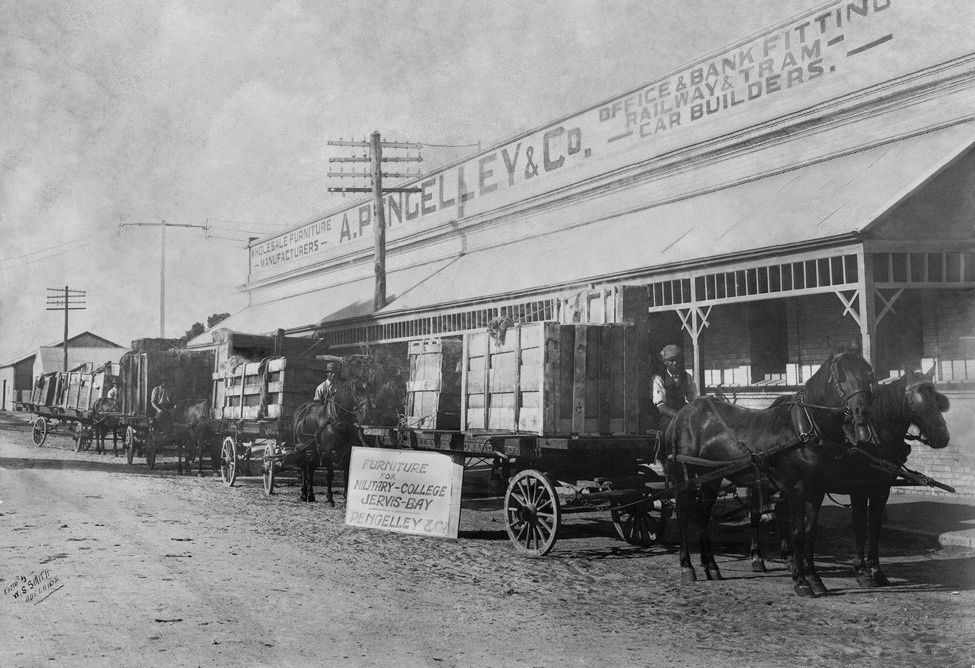
Crates on trolleys, circa 1910

The trolley and lift van was a system of moving goods in the horse-drawn era. According to Smith, this method was "widely used, especially for overseas house removals or furniture deliveries, from the 1880's".

A trolley is a horse-drawn wagon with a platform body with four relatively small wheels mounted underneath it, the front two on a turntable undercarriage. It was drawn by a pair of draft horses with the driver either walking beside or on a high seat mounted at the front of the trolley bed.

The lift van is a sturdy wooden box 11 ft 6 in (3.51 m) to 17 ft (5.2 m) long, 6 ft 3 in (1.91 m) wide and 6 ft 6 in (1.98 m) high. It was a precursor to the metal intermodal containers. It has two wrought iron straps passing down the sides and under the bottom, having a sling shackled to holes in the top ends of the straps so that the whole crate and its contents could be lifted by crane onto the trolley for movement by road, onto a railway truck or into the hold of a ship. According to Ingram, "there were flat, open, covered and insulated types to expedite the traffic to its markets".

It was also used for the carriage of meat. In this case, the lift van had a double floor, roof and walls with insulating material such as cork and a layer of paper between the cork and each skin. The insulation thickness was about 2 in (51 mm) in the floor and 5 in (130 mm) elsewhere.

The system provided a means of door-to-door transit and was used particularly for furniture removals. The furniture makers and merchants, Maple and Co., in particular, used it to deliver between their depots in London and Paris.

The term "lift van" is still used in modern shipping; it is usually a wooden crate on a pallet that can be lifted by a fork lift, and placed inside a large metal shipping container.

== See also ==
- Pantechnicon van – type of early horse-drawn delivery van
- Intermodal container – modern equivalent of the lift van
