= Conflat =

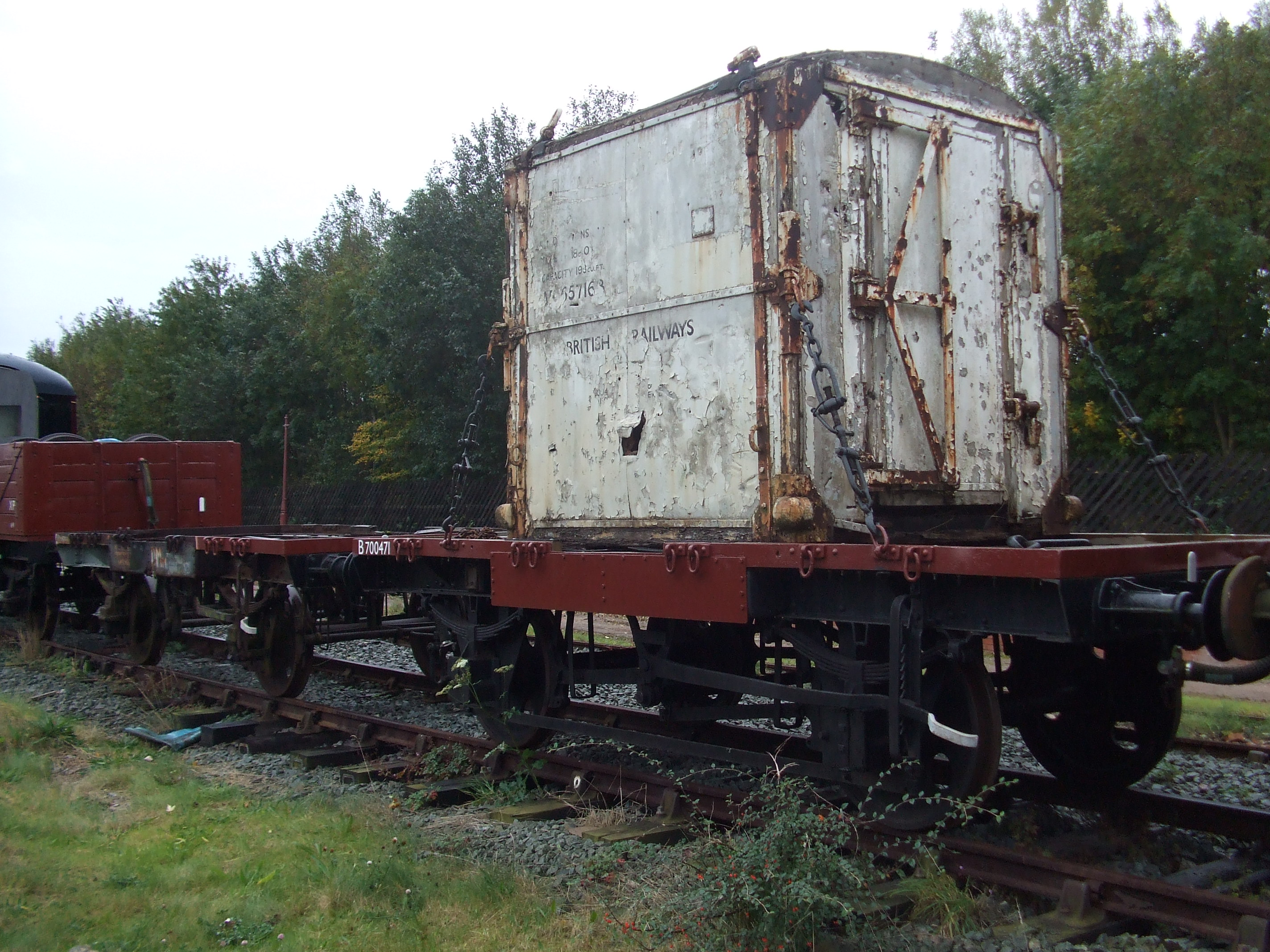
Two Conflats with an insulated container, at Ruddington

Conflat is a United Kingdom railway term for a short wheelbase flat wagon container wagon.

British Railways used several standard types of wagon. The Conflat A, which could carry one type 'B', or two type 'A', containers, was the most common. It was regularly used to carry AF (frozen food) containers: while the Conflat L, which could carry three smaller containers for bulk powders, was also produced in large numbers.

The Conflat B wagon could carry 2 AFP (frozen food) containers. These were slightly wider than the standard AF containers, and were designed to carry loads on pallets.

== History ==
'Conflat' is the telegraphic code within the Great Western Railway's coding of railway wagons for a container wagon. Unlike normal wagon loads, containers were only listed to carry furniture or goods (unless they were refrigerated containers, which carried frozen products kept cold by ice) which needed to be placed on a specialist flatbed wagon which had train braking capability due to the fragile nature of the products carried.

The wagons were removed from service (as were the containers themselves) when more modern containers came into use.

== Gallery ==
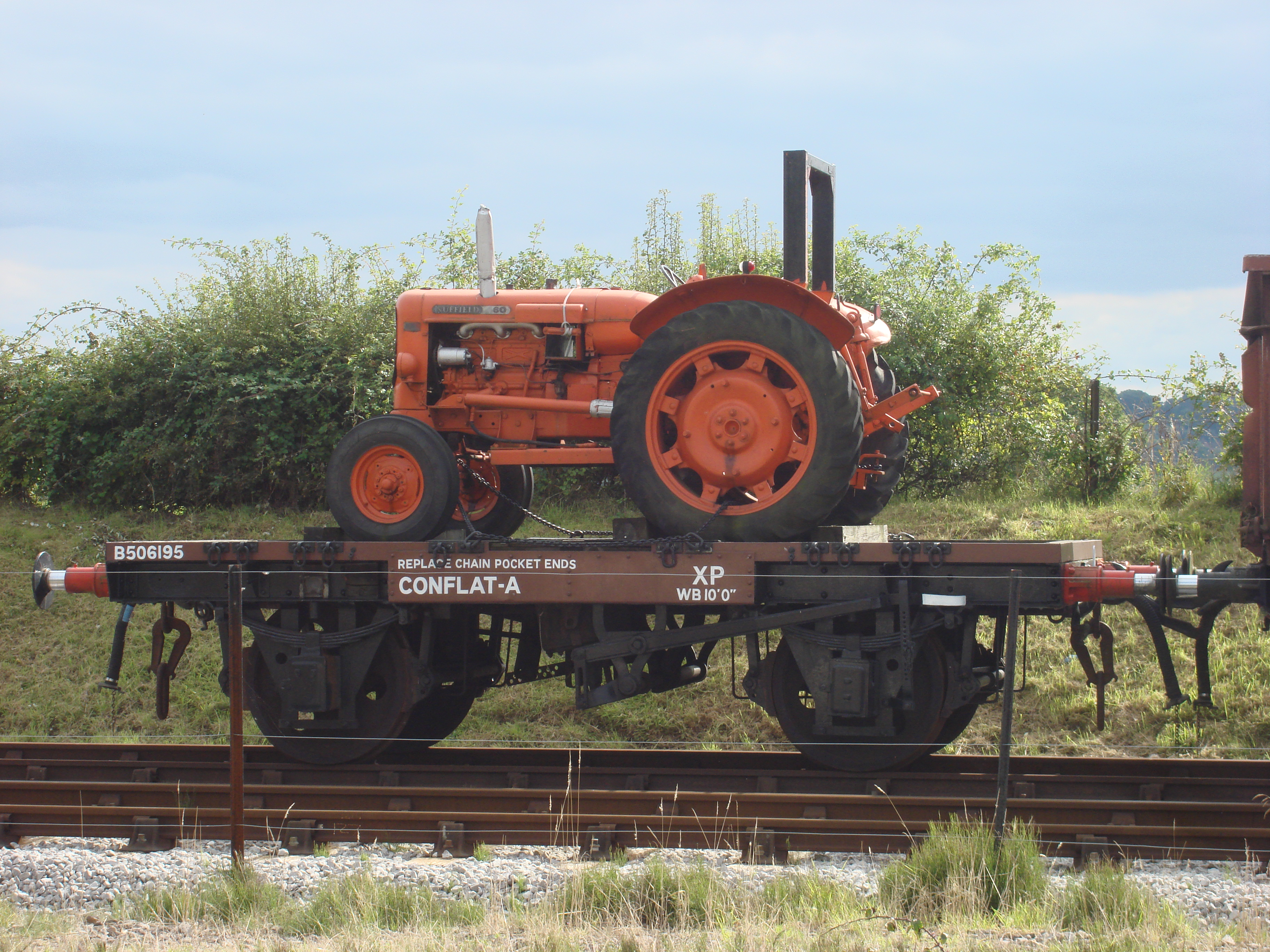
Preserved Conflat A with tractor (not a normal load)

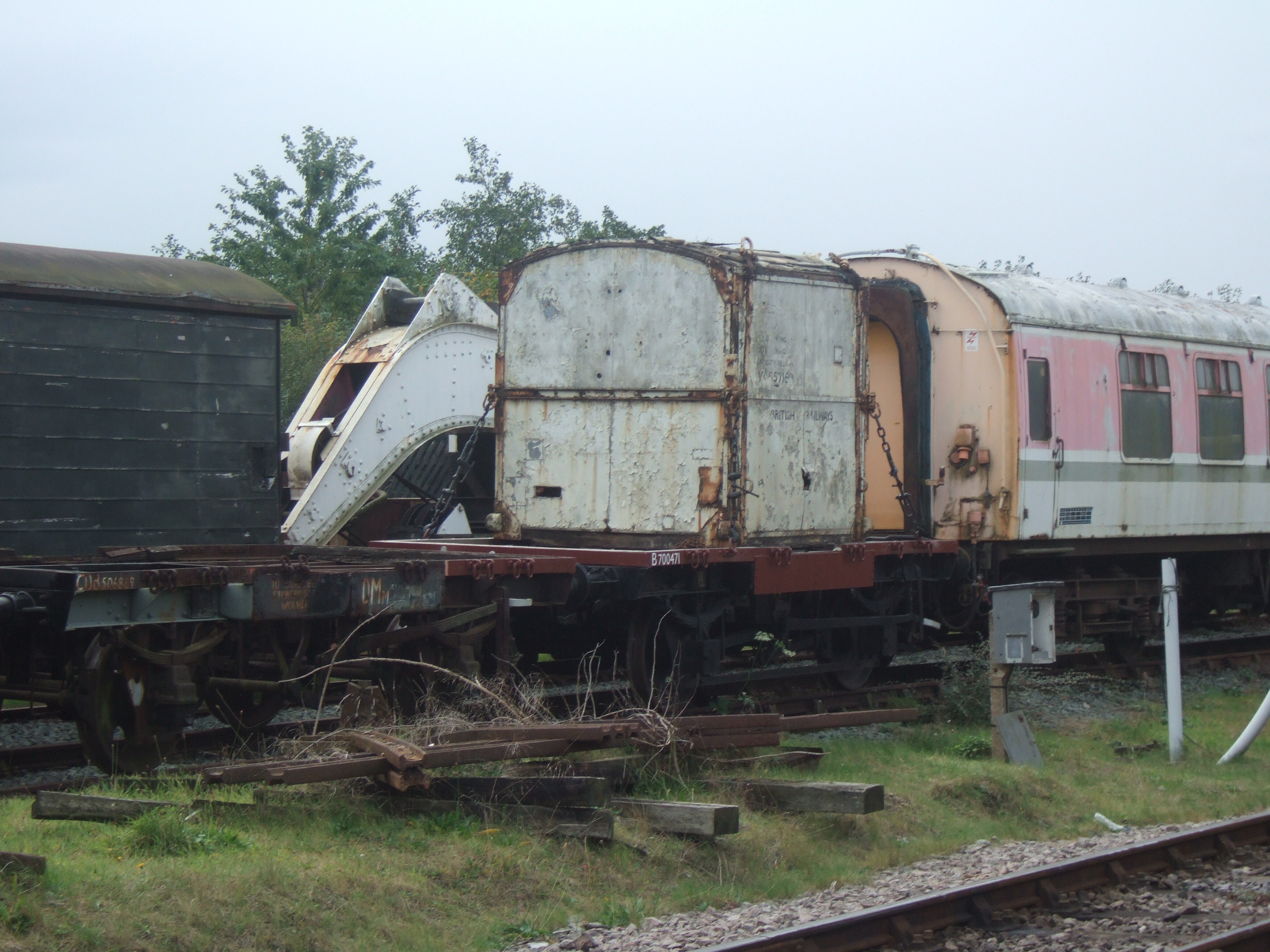
Conflats and BR Container

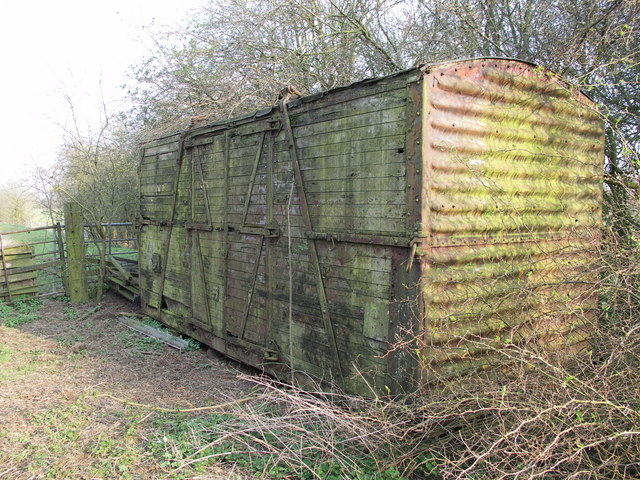
BR Type B container

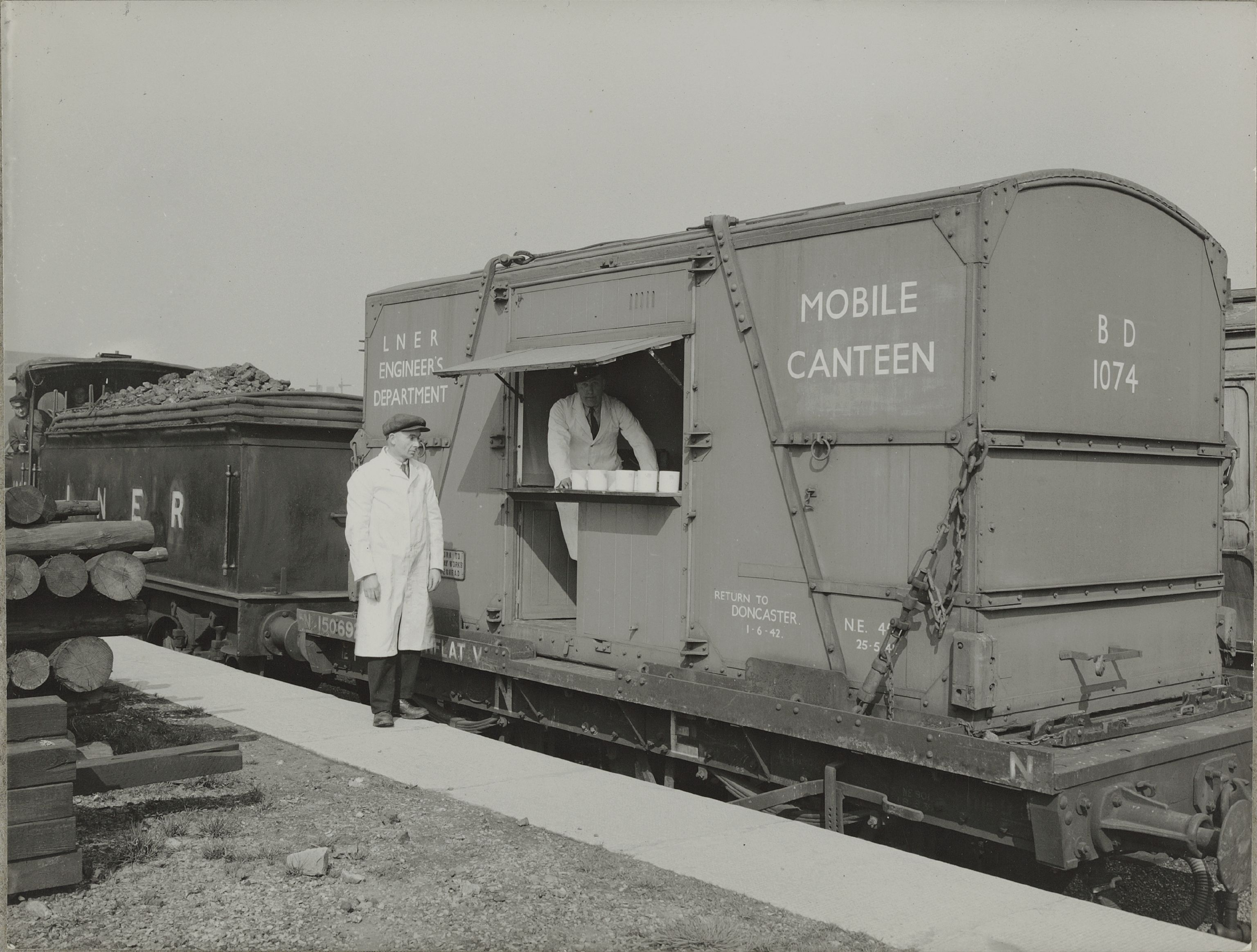
Conflat with a mobile canteen of the LNER

== See also ==
- Condor (express freight)
- Flatbed trolley
- Flatbed truck
- Flatcar
