= Twenty-foot equivalent unit =

Unit of cargo capacity

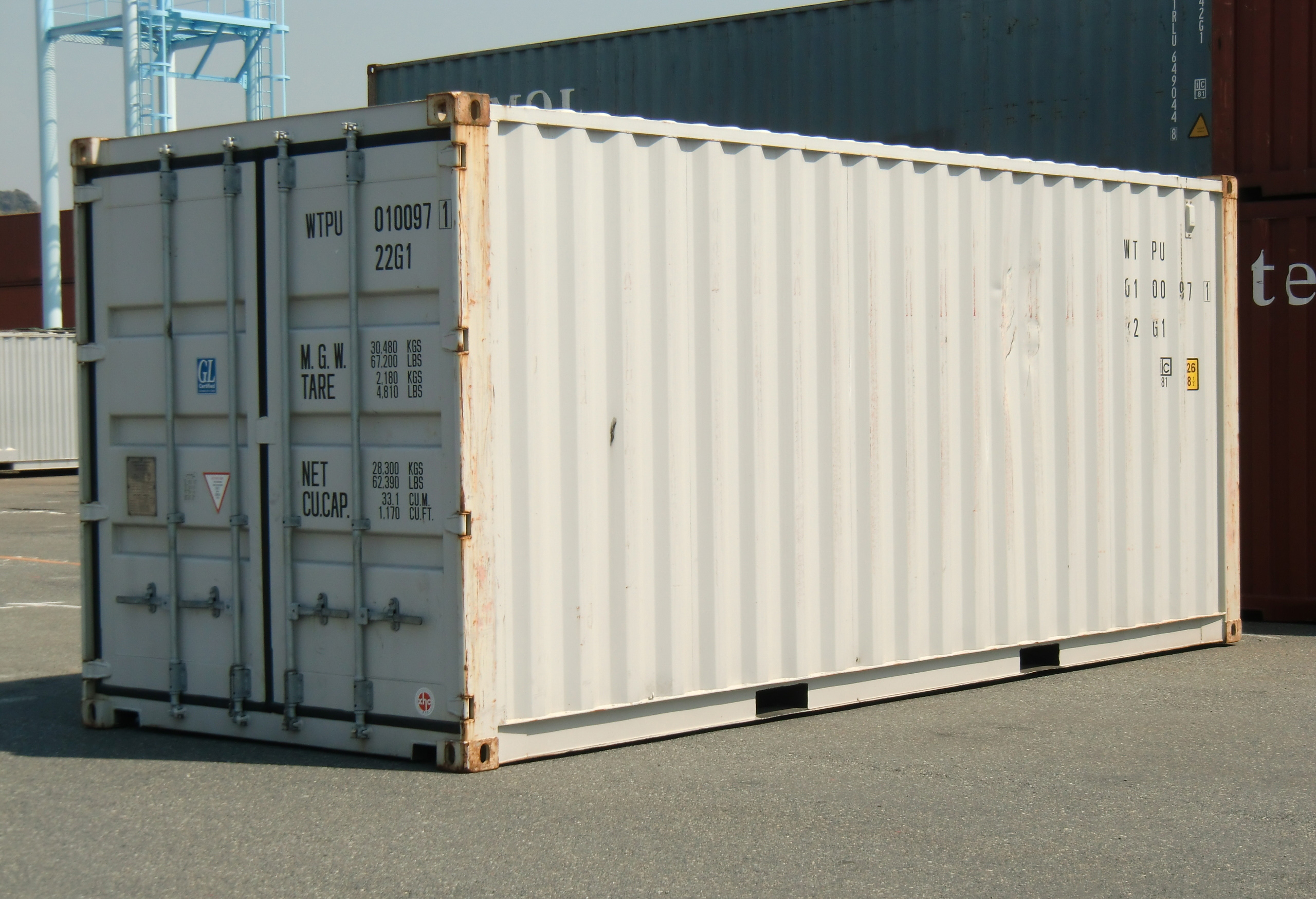
A 20-foot-long (6.1 m) ISO container equals 1 TEU.

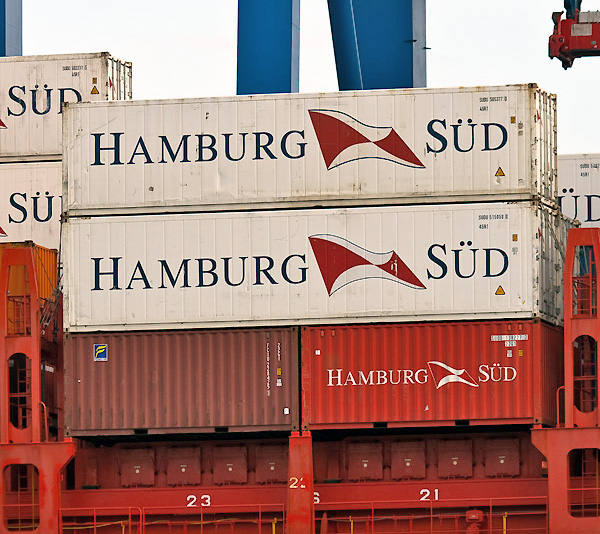
Two 40-foot-long (12 m) containers stacked on top of two twenty-foot containers. These four containers represent 6 TEU.

The twenty-foot equivalent unit (abbreviated TEU or teu) is a general unit of cargo capacity, often used for container ships and container ports. It is based on the volume of a 20-foot-long (6.1 m) intermodal container, a standard-sized metal box that can be easily transferred between different modes of transportation, such as ships, trains, and trucks.

== Detailed dimensions: 20-foot and 40-foot containers ==
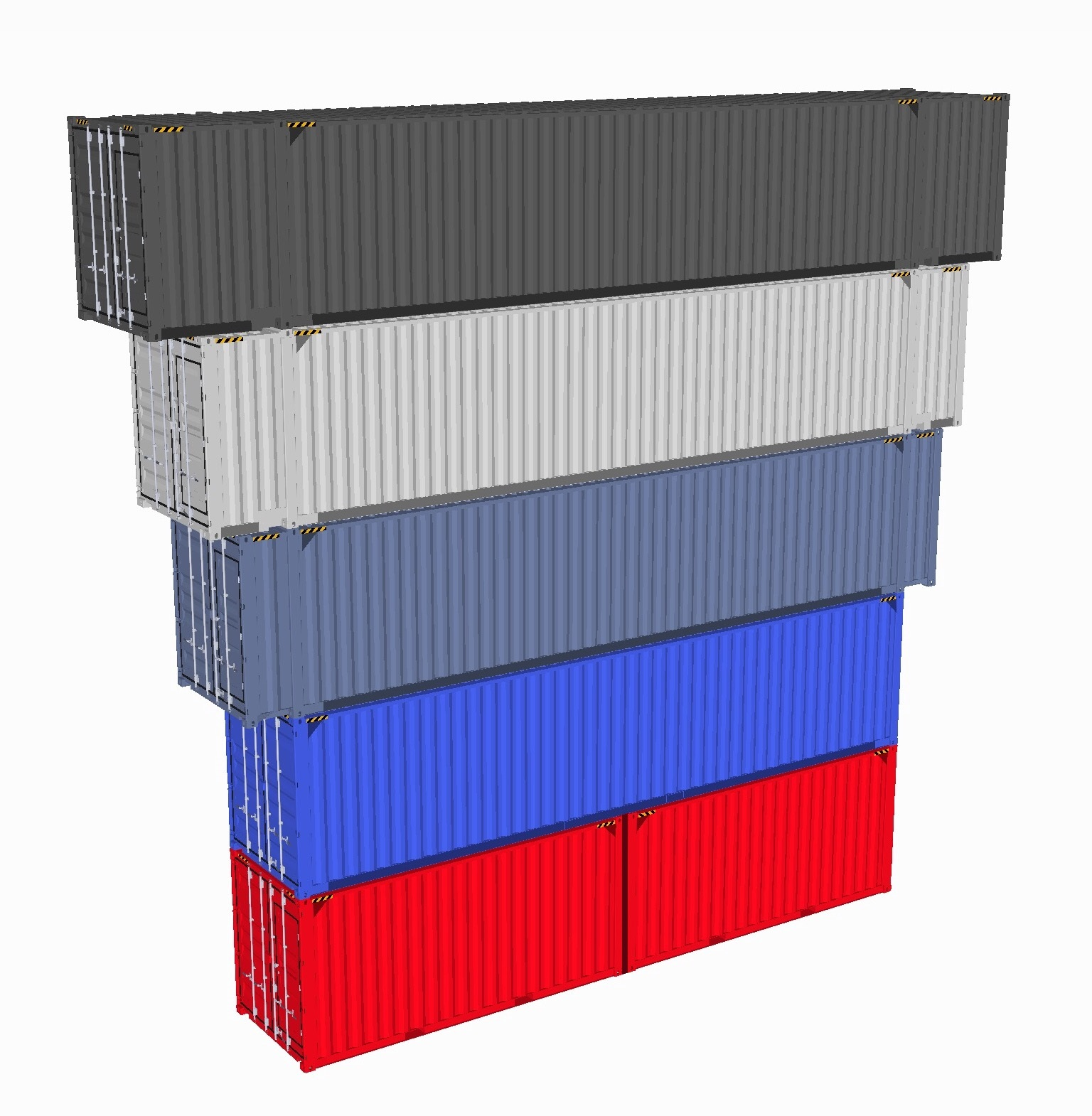
Stacked top to bottom: 53 feet (16.15 m), 48 feet (14.63 m), 45 feet (13.72 m), 40 feet (12.19 m), and two end-to-end, 20 feet (6.10 m) containers

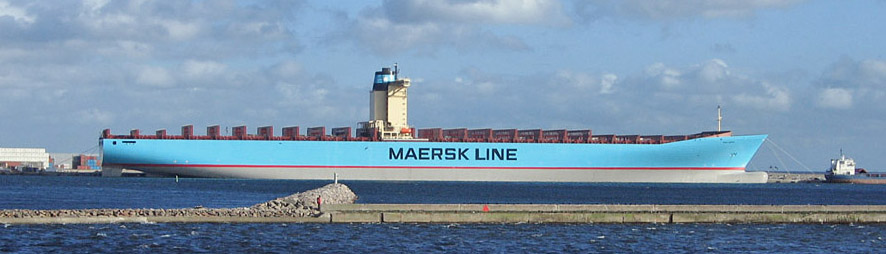
The MV Emma Mærsk can carry 11,000 TEU of 14 tons gross apiece. (Note: Maersk claims 14,780 TEU worth of space and a loading plan of 15,212 TEU.)

The standard intermodal container is 19 7/8 feet (6.06 m) long and eight feet (2.44 m) wide. The height of such containers is most commonly 8 1/2 feet (2.6 m) but ranges from 4 1/4 feet (1.3 m) to 9 1/2 feet (2.9 m).

Another standard container is slightly more than twice as long: 40-foot (12.19 m), dubbed a forty-foot equivalent unit (often FEU or feu).

The reason the smaller container is 1 1/2 inches (3.8 cm) short of 20 feet is to allow it to be stacked efficiently with 40-foot containers. The twistlocks on a ship are set so that two standard 20-foot containers have a gap of 3 inches (7.6 cm), allowing a single 40-foot container to fit precisely on top.

The 40-foot containers have found wider acceptance, as they can be pulled by semi-trailer trucks. The length of such a combination is within the limits of national road regulations in many countries, requiring no special permission. As some road regulations allow longer trucks, there are also variations of the standard 40-foot container; in Europe and most other places a container of 45 feet (13.72 m) may be pulled as a trailer. Containers with a length of 48 feet (14.63 m) or 53 feet (16.15 m) are restricted to road and rail transport in North America. Although longer than 40 feet, these variants are put in the same class of forty-foot equivalent units.

== Equivalence ==
TEU capacities for common container sizes
Length	Width	Height	Internal volume	Internal floor area	TEU	Notes
20 ft (6.1 m)	8 ft (2.44 m)	8 1/2 ft (2.6 m)	1,172 ft^{3} (33.2 m^{3})	160 ft^{2} (14.9 m^{2})	1	
40 ft (12.2 m)	8 ft (2.44 m)	8 1/2 ft (2.6 m)	2,389 ft^{3} (67.6 m^{3})	320 ft^{2} (29.7 m^{2})	2	
48 ft (14.6 m)	8 ft (2.44 m)	8 1/2 ft (2.6 m)	3,264 ft^{3} (92.4 m^{3})	384 ft^{2} (35.7 m^{2})	2.4	
53 ft (16.2 m)	8 ft (2.44 m)	8 1/2 ft (2.6 m)	3,604 ft^{3} (102.1 m^{3})	424 ft^{2} (39.4 m^{2})	2.65	
40 ft (12.2 m)	8 ft (2.44 m)	9 1/2 ft (2.9 m)	2,694 ft^{3} (76.3 m^{3})	320 ft^{2} (29.7 m^{2})	2	High cube
20 ft (6.1 m)	8 ft (2.44 m)	9 1/2 ft (2.9 m)	1,520 ft^{3} (43 m^{3})	160 ft^{2} (14.9 m^{2})	1	High cube
20 ft (6.1 m)	8 ft (2.44 m)	4 1/4 ft (1.3 m)	680 ft^{3} (19.3 m^{3})	160 ft^{2} (14.9 m^{2})	1	Half-height

The carrying capacity of a ship is usually measured by mass (the deadweight tonnage) or by volume (the net register tonnage). Deadweight tonnage is generally measured now in metric tons (tonnes). Register tons are measured in cubic feet, with one register ton equivalent to 100 ft^{3} (2.83 m^{3}).

As the TEU is an inexact unit, it cannot be converted precisely into other units. The related unit forty-foot equivalent unit, however, is defined as two TEU.

It is common to designate a 45-foot (13.7 m) container as 2 TEU, rather than 2 1/4 TEU.

The most common twenty-foot container occupies a space 20 feet (6.1 m) long, 8 feet (2.44 m) wide, and 8 1/2 feet (2.6 m) high, with an allowance externally for the corner castings; the internal volume is 1,172 ft^{3} (33.2 m^{3}). However, both 9 1/2-foot-tall (2.9 m) High cube and 4 1/4-foot (1.3 m) half height containers are also reckoned as 1 TEU. This gives a volume range of 680 to 1,520 ft^{3} (19 to 43 m^{3}) for one TEU.

While the TEU is not itself a measure of mass, some conclusions can be drawn about the maximum mass that a TEU can represent. The maximum gross mass for a 20-foot (6.1 m) dry cargo container is 24,000 kilograms (53,000 lb). Subtracting the tare mass of the container itself, the maximum amount of cargo per TEU is reduced to about 21,600 kilograms (47,600 lb).

Similarly, the maximum gross mass for a 40-foot (12.2 m) dry cargo container (including the 9 1/2-foot (2.9 m) High cube container) is 30,480 kilograms (67,200 lb). After correcting for tare weight, this gives a cargo capacity of 26,500 kilograms (58,400 lb).

Twenty-foot "heavy tested" containers are available for heavy goods such as heavy machinery. These containers allow a maximum weight of 67,200 pounds (30,500 kg), an empty weight of 5,290 pounds (2,400 kg), and a net load of 61,910 pounds (28,080 kg).

== See also ==
- Containerization
- Panama Canal toll system
- Shipping ton
- List of busiest container ports

== Bibliography ==
- Maersk Shipping (2010). "Maersk Container Brochure". Maersk. Archived from the original on 2008-11-15.
- CIRCA (2008). "Glossary: TEU (Twenty-foot Equivalent Unit)". The European Commission. Archived from the original on 2008-04-14.
- Rowlett, Russ; University of North Carolina at Chapel Hill (2000). "How Many? A Dictionary of Units of Measurement". University of North Carolina at Chapel Hill.
- Bohlman, Michael (September 2001). "ISO's container standards are nothing but good news". ISO Bulletin. International Organization for Standardization: 15. Archived from the original (PDF) on 2014-10-16.
- Organisation for Economic Co-operation and Development (2002-06-19). "Twenty Foot Equivalent Unit (TEU)". Glossary of Statistical Terms. Organisation for Economic Co-operation and Development.
