= Container chassis =

Trailer for transporting intermodal containers

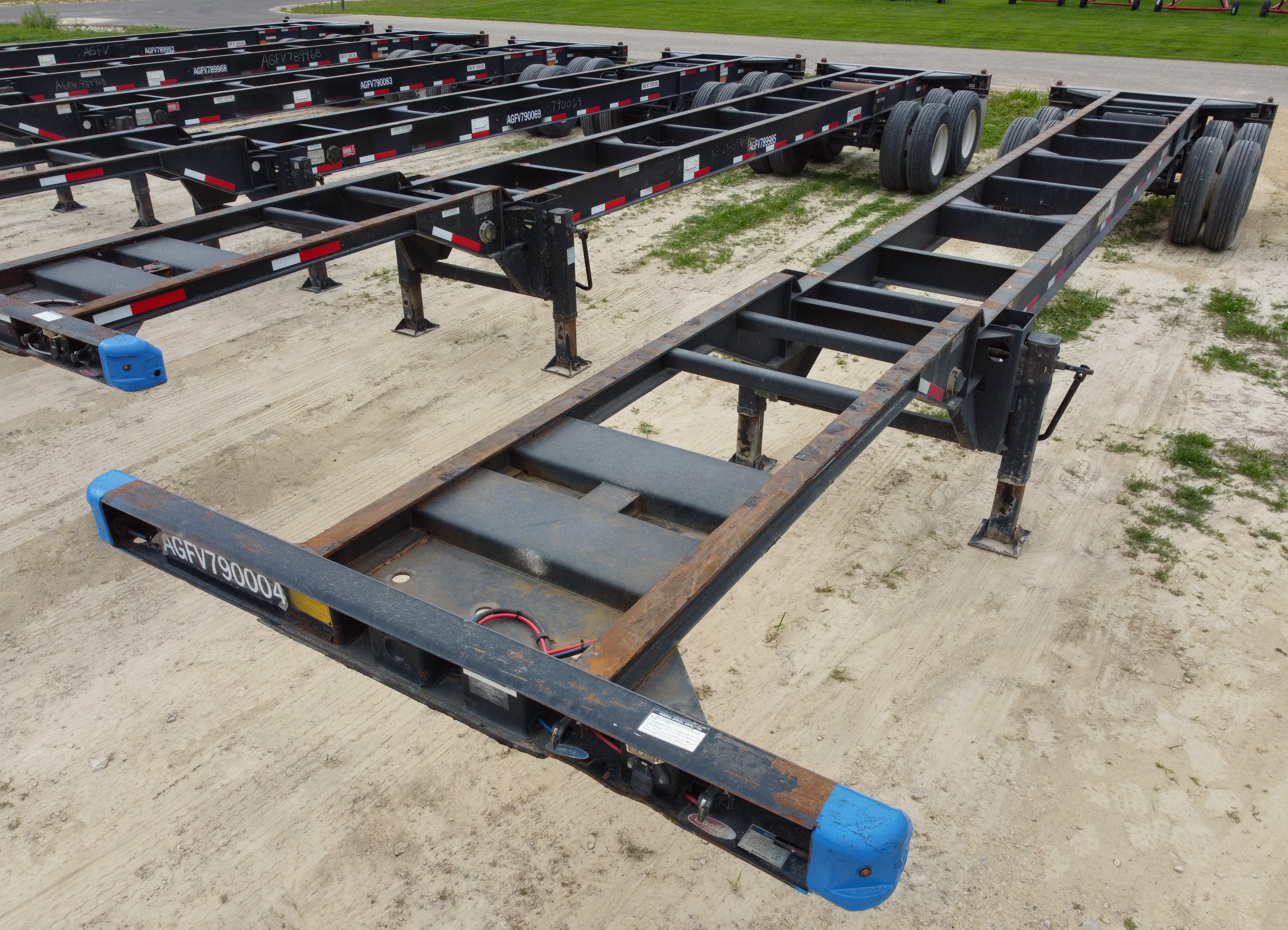
40 foot container chassis

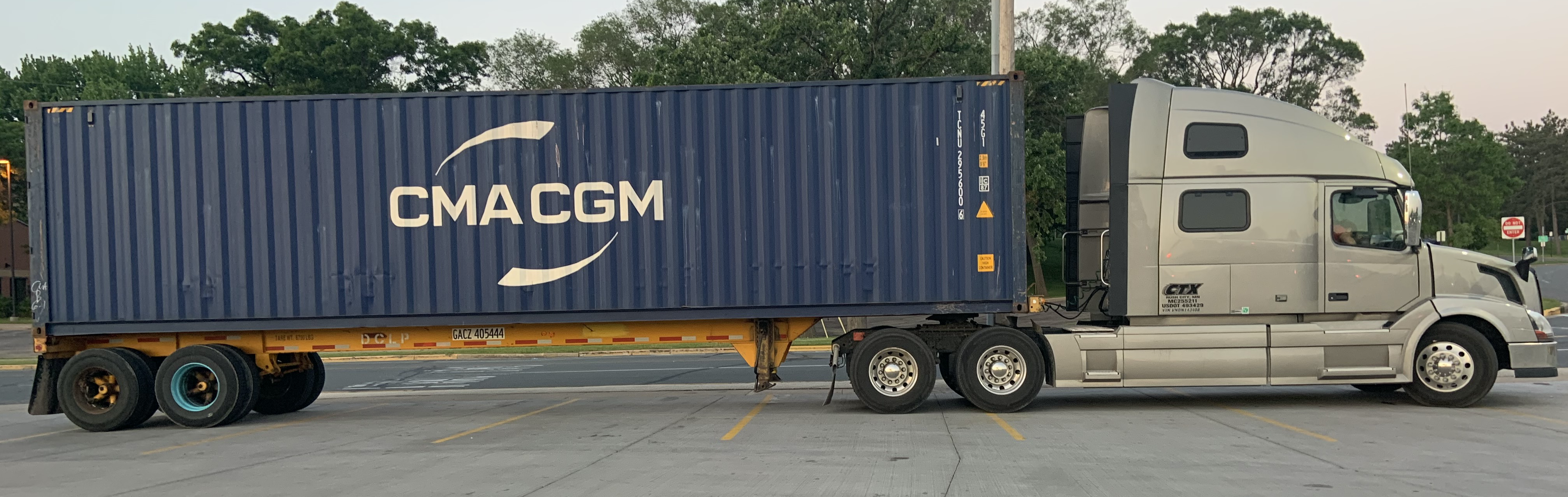
40 foot container on a 40 foot container chassis

A container chassis, also called intermodal chassis or skeletal trailer, is a type of semi-trailer designed to securely carry an intermodal container. Chassis are used by truckers to deliver containers between ports, railyards, container depots, and shipper facilities, and are thus a key part of the intermodal supply chain.

== Operation ==
The use of chassis to haul containers over-the-road is known as drayage trucking, and is a section of intermodal, which also includes rail transport of containers using well or flat cars and overseas transport in ships or barges. Like other intermodal equipment, chassis are equipped with twistlocks at each corner which allows a container (hoisted onto or off the chassis by a crane), to be locked on for secure transport or unlocked to be lifted off. The length of a chassis corresponds to which container size will fit (i.e., a 40-foot-long chassis fits a 40-foot-long container), but some companies manufacture adjustable length trailers.

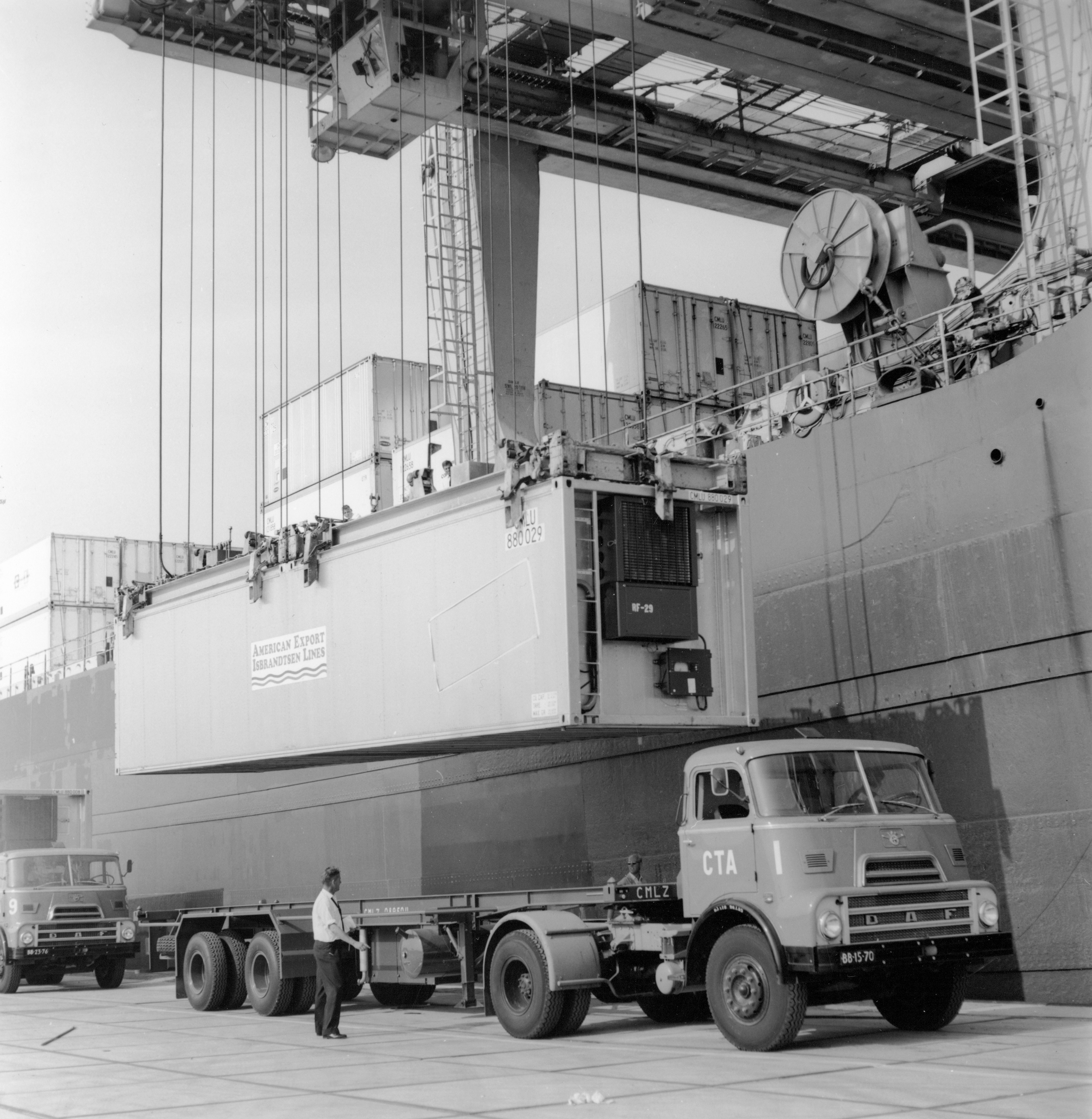
A port crane lifts a container from a ship to a chassis for road transport

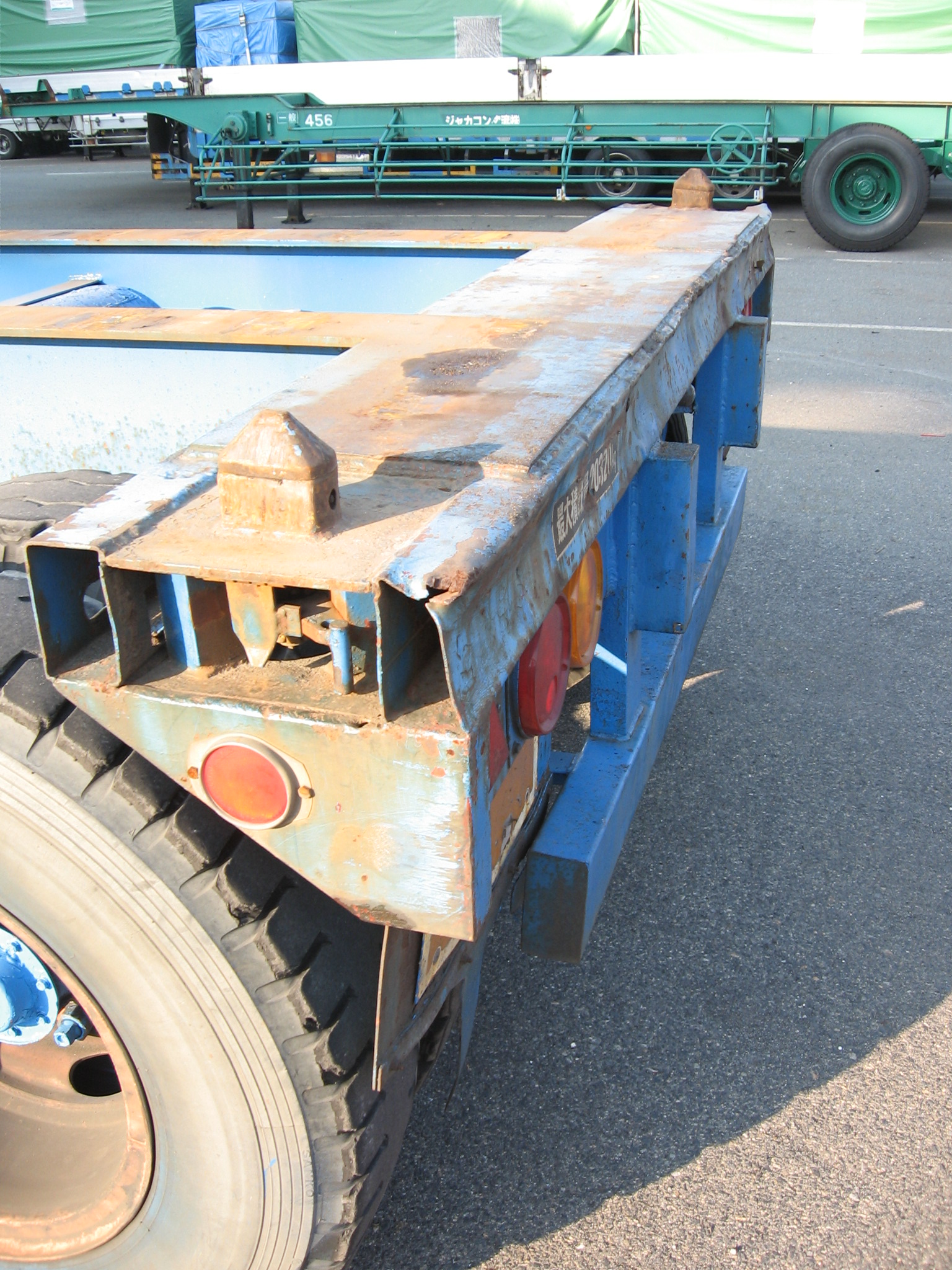
Twistlocks

Semi-tractor trucks hook up to chassis via the kingpin. When disconnected from a tractor, the chassis' landing gear can be cranked down to park it.

Portable generators, also called gensets, can be mounted (underslung) onto chassis. These gensets are used to power a refrigerated container.

The axle group on some chassis (especially 20-foot and 53-foot units) can be slid backwards or forwards to change the weight distribution of heavy containers, allowing safe operation and compliance with weight restrictions.

An identification number is often stenciled on chassis to track each unit in a fleet. According to both the ISO 6346 standard and AAR code classifications, a chassis should have the letter "Z" at the end of its reporting mark.

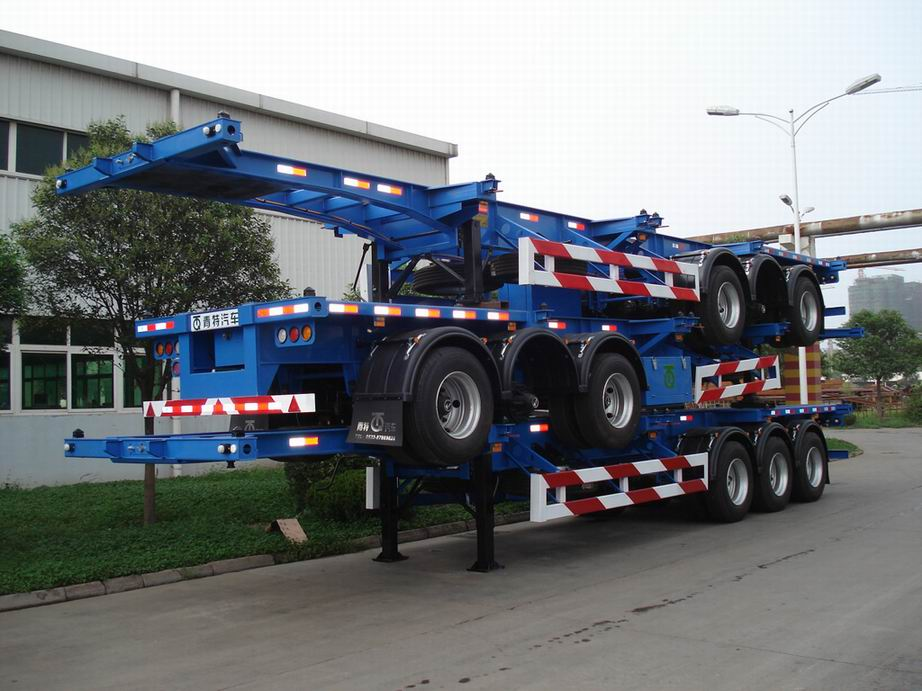
Chassis can be stacked to reduce parking space

A variation is the tank container chassis, which are used for ISO tank containers. They are characteristically longer and have lower deck height than standard chassis, ideal for transporting constantly shifting payloads. These chassis can also be fitted with additional accessories including: lift kits to facilitate product discharge, hose tubes, and hi/lo kits to carry two empty tanks. They come in tandem axle, spread axle, tri-axle, and hi/lo combo configurations.

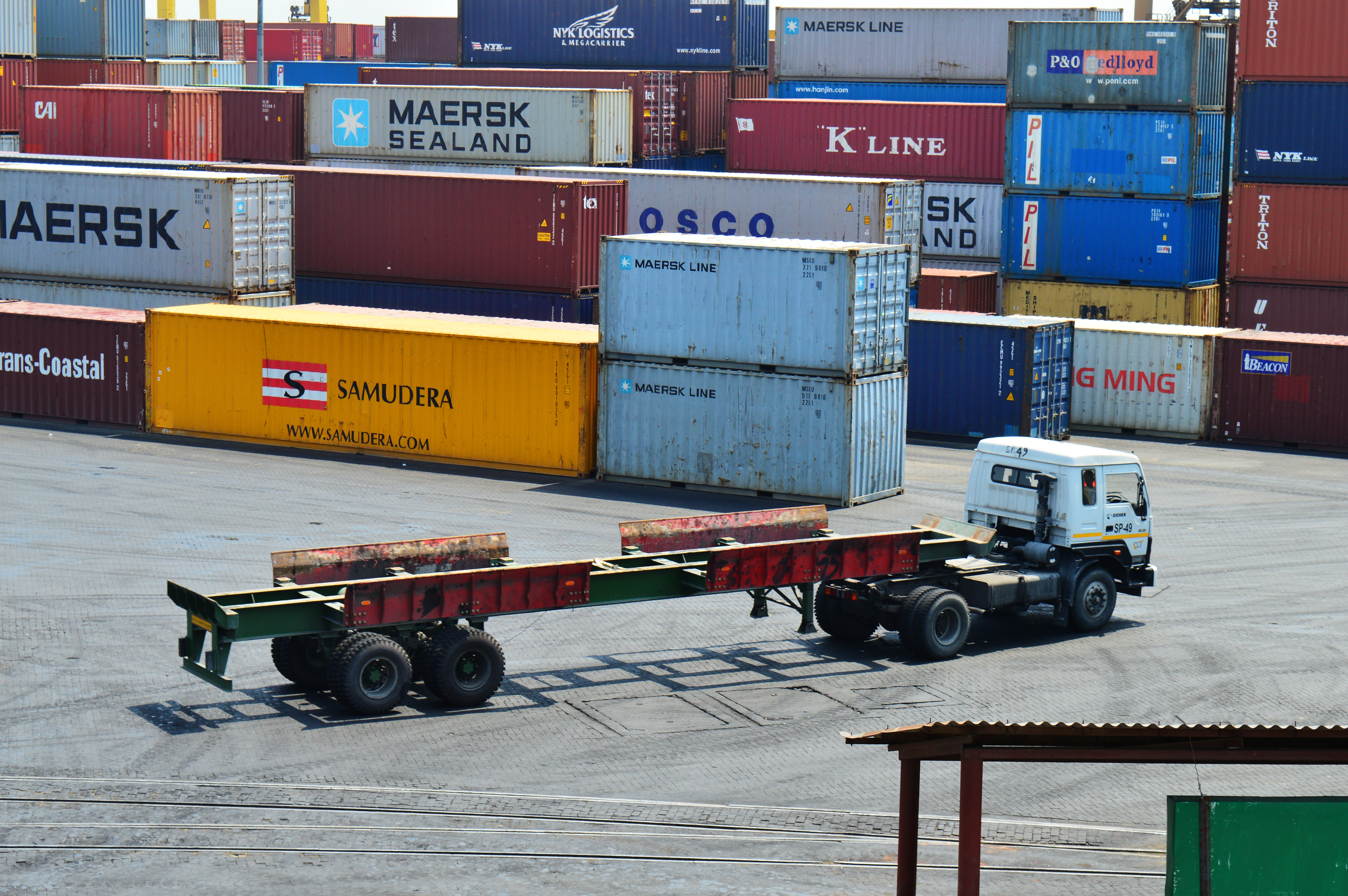
A truck hauling a bomb cart, which are used by dockworkers to shuttle containers within a port. They have side panels instead of twistlocks which allows crane operators to quickly place containers on them to hasten the unloading process.

== Chassis pools ==
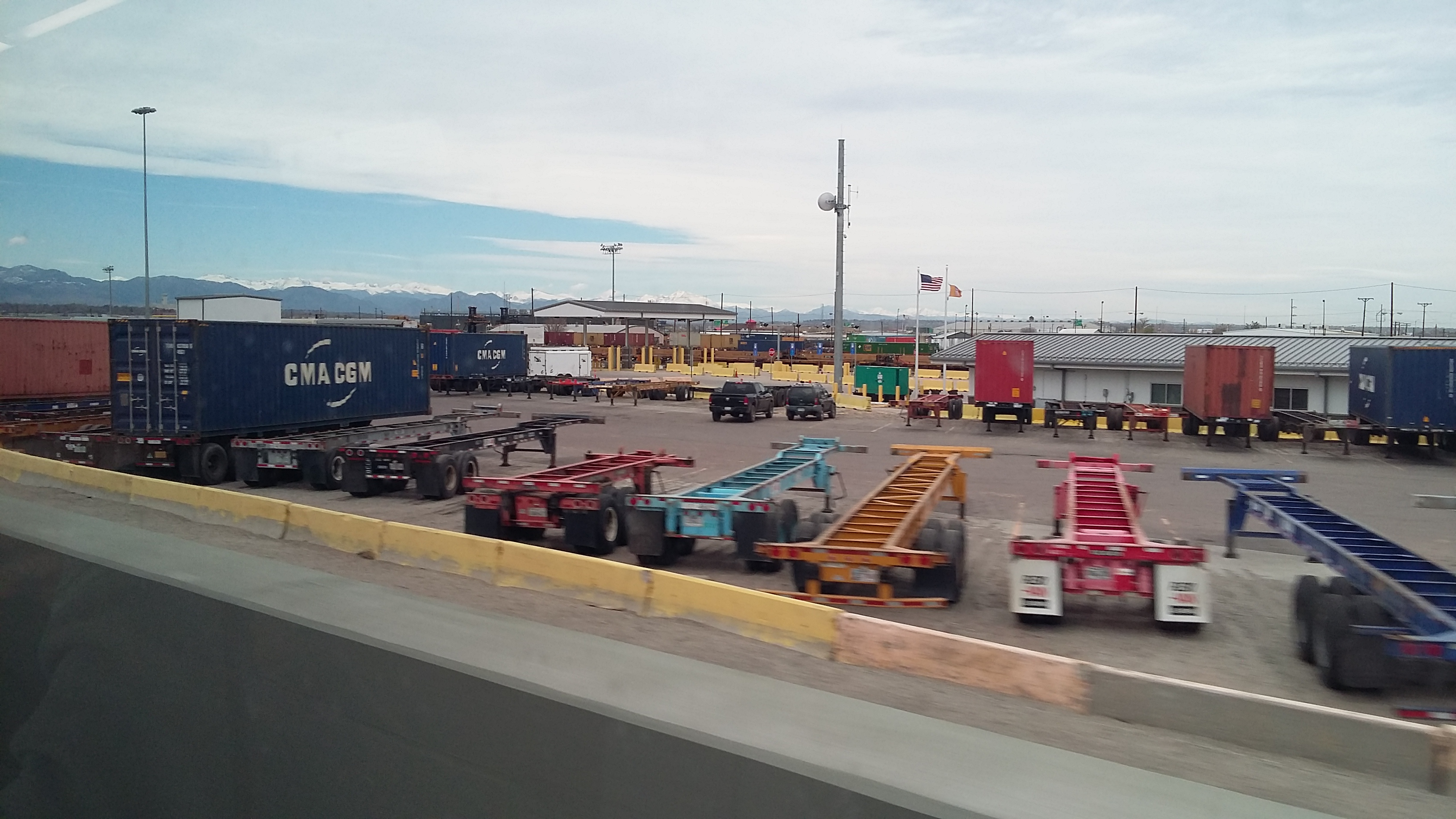
Bare container chassis parked at an intermodal facility

Unlike other countries where chassis are mostly owned or long-term leased by trucking companies, in the United States most chassis are currently owned by a few leasing companies (pools) which rent out the equipment to truckers. When a trucker leaves or enters a facility with a pool chassis, an electronic data interchange (EDI) record is generated at the facility gate which identifies the trucking company and the chassis pool, and this allows the pool to invoice the appropriate trucking company for chassis usage. The system is influenced by the steamship lines and by the operation of container terminals. Firstly, containers are commonly stored on chassis as a single mounted unit at rail yards and depots—such terminals are known as "wheeled" facilities. Secondly, steamship lines offer a service called ″carrier haulage″ or ″store door delivery″, whereby they arrange the drayage of a customer’s container. The steamship line hires a local trucking company and pays the pool for the chassis usage.

As a result, steamship lines formed contractual agreements with the pools which entail that when a container is on-terminal it must be on a pool specified by the steamship line. This means that at wheeled facilities, containers are mounted onto chassis selected by the steamship line before the trucker arrives to pick-up. Some disadvantages of this system are that it can restrict truckers' choice of which chassis to use and it can cause "chassis splits", which are when a container and its required chassis pool are in different locations.

== Shortages ==
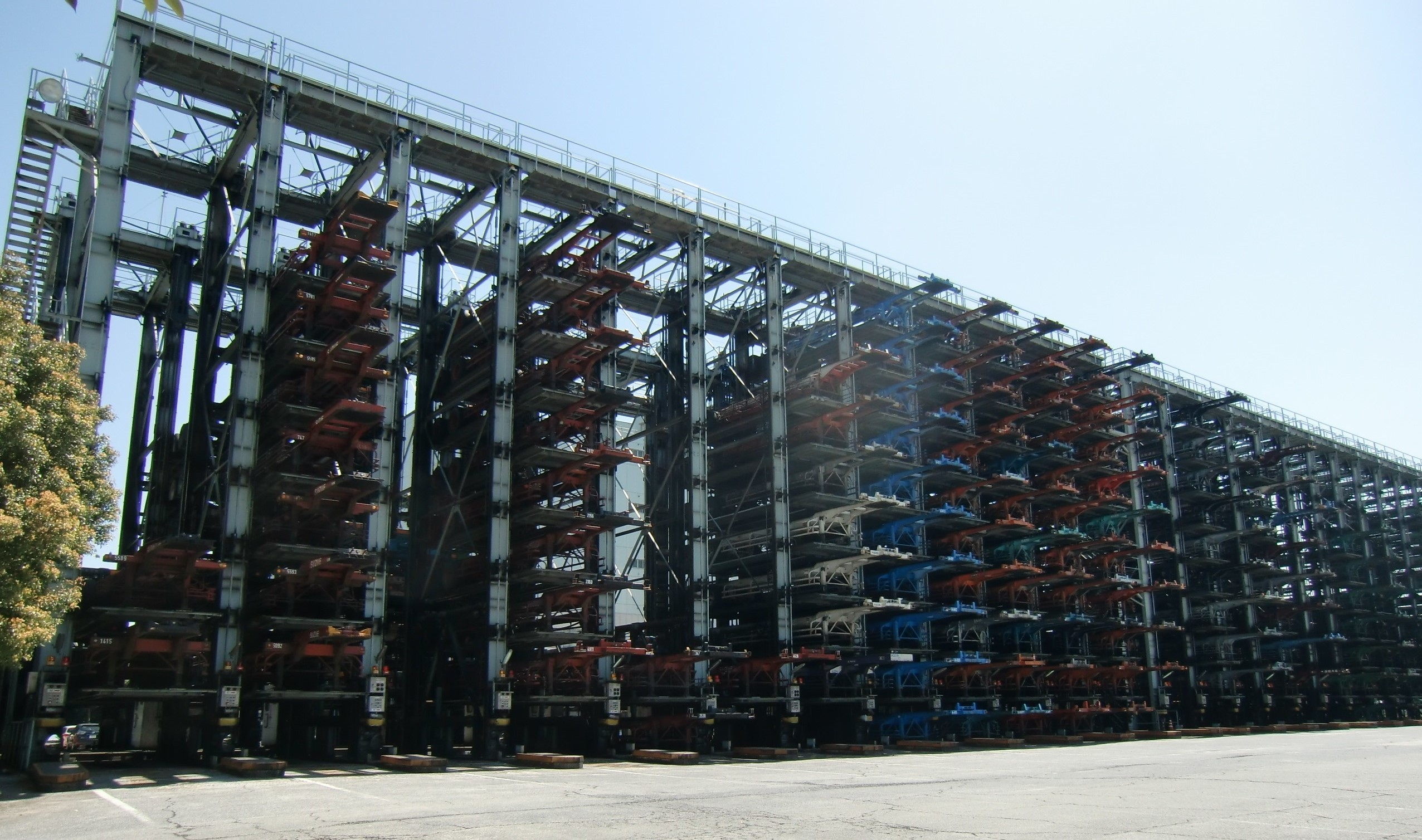
A stacking tower for container chassis in Japan

In the United States, container chassis shortages are a chronic problem, especially during peaks in container volume. There are several causes of chassis shortages, but a common problem is excessive off-terminal dwell time. Off-terminal dwell time is the length of time a shipper keeps a chassis/container at their premises. Long dwell times mean less free chassis on-site at ports and rail ramps.

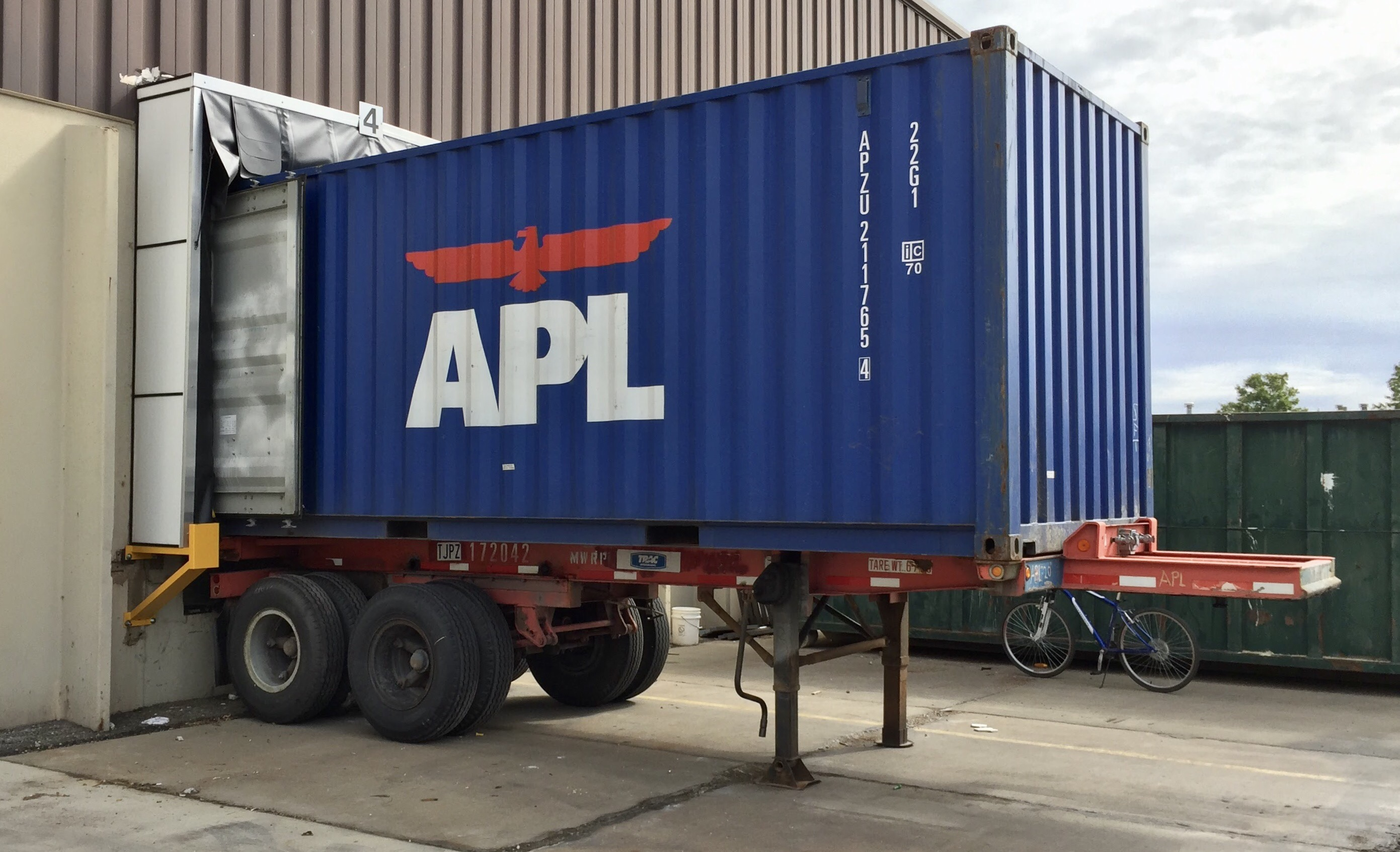
An APL 20-foot container and chassis at a loading dock

== See also ==
- Semi-trailer
- Containerization
- Intermodal freight transport
- Container port
- Sidelifter
- Drayage
- ISO 6346
- Swap body
- Roadrailer
