= ISO 668 =

International standard which classifies intermodal freight shipping containers

- Series 1 freight containers – Classification, dimensions and ratings
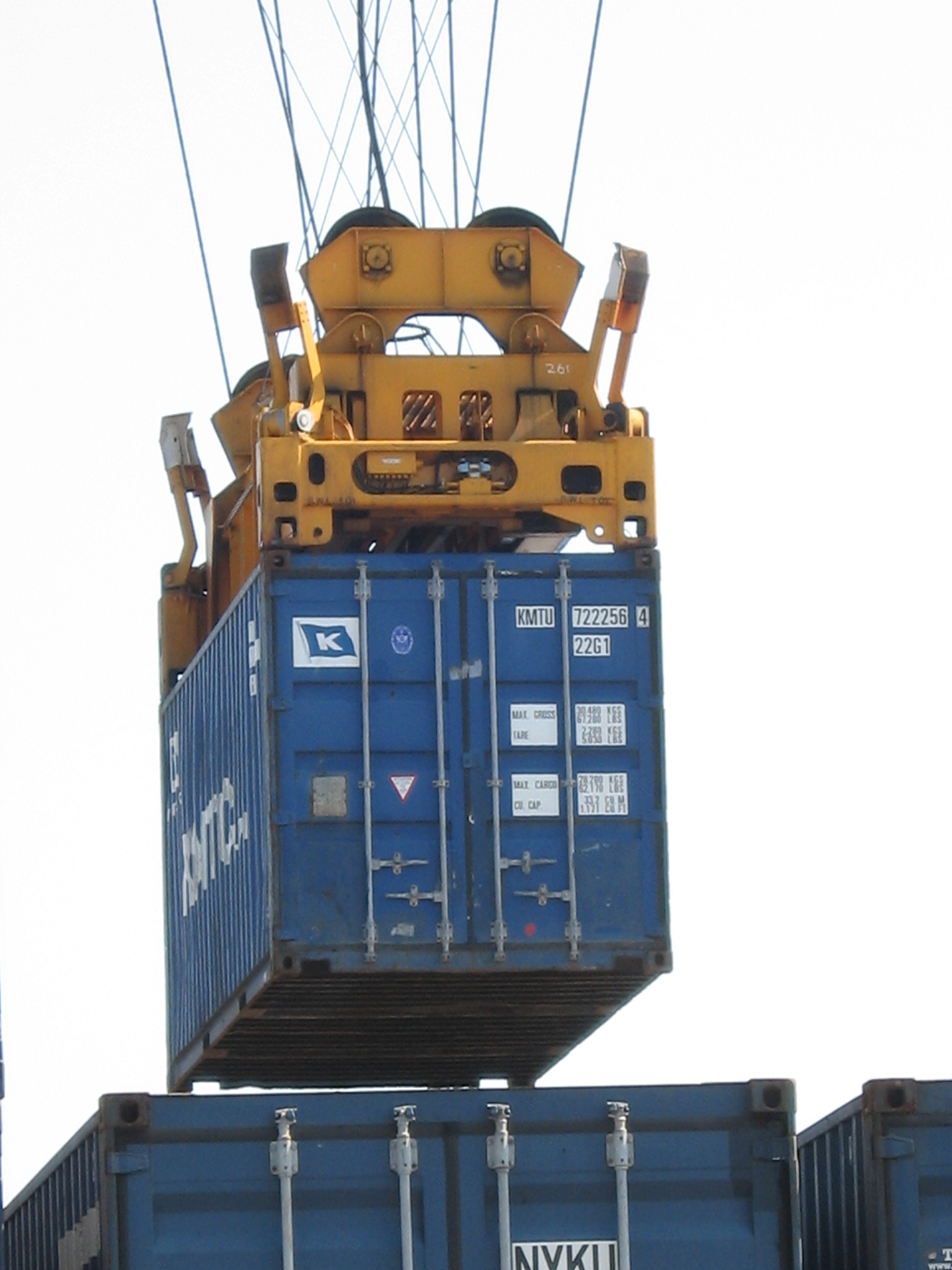
- Abbreviation: ISO 668:2020
- Latest version: 7; 668:2020
- Preview version: Sixth edition 2013-08-01
- Organization: International Organization for Standardization
- Committee: Technical Committee ISO/TC 104: Freight containers, Subcommittee SC 1: General purpose containers

ISO 668 – Series 1 freight containers – Classification, dimensions and ratings is an ISO international standard which nominally classifies intermodal freight shipping containers, and standardizes their sizes, measurements and weight specifications.

The current version of the standard is the Seventh edition (2020), which integrates version E. The standard was prepared by Technical Committee ISO/TC 104: Freight containers, Subcommittee SC 1: General purpose containers.

Introduced in 1968, ISO 668 currently regulates both external and internal dimensions of containers, as well as the minimum door opening sizes, where applicable. Minimum internal dimensions were earlier defined by ISO standard 1894: 'General purpose series 1 freight containers – Minimum internal dimensions'. Its second edition appeared in 1979, but was withdrawn, once revised by ISO 1496‑1 of 1990. The current version of ISO 1496‑1 is 2013, including Amendment 1 of 2016, last reviewed and reconfirmed in 2019.

ISO 668 also specifies the respective associated gross weight ratings, and includes requirements for load transfer areas in the base structures of containers, since Amendment 1 of 2005. Amendment 2 of 2005 then also standardized 45 ft (13.7 m) length containers.

The maximum gross mass (MGM) rating of laden 20- and 30-foot length units was notably increased to 30,480 kg (67,200 lb) by Amendment 1 of 2005. Until then, the MGM for 20- and 30-foot boxes was 24,000 kg (52,910 lb), and 25,400 kg (56,000 lb) respectively.

However, since Amendment 2 of 2016, the maximum gross mass for ISO-standard (Series 1) containers of all sizes, (except 10‑foot units), has until now been further increased to a maximum of 36,000 kg (79,370 lb). Draft Amendment 1 of ISO 668: 2020 – for the eighth edition – maintains this. This is remarkably heavy, given that U.S. trucks, including the weight of the truck itself, are federally limited to a max gross mass of 80,000 lb (36,290 kg) – without special transport permits and regimes.

A separate standard is set for the required stacking strength, or 'maximum superimposed mass' (MSM) for standard containers. The ISO standard for Series 1 containers, ISO 1496‑1, established this, among other characteristics, for many years set at 192,000 kg (423,300 lb). However, in order to keep pace with the increase of container maximum gross weight, the continuing growth in container ship size, and the related height of container stacks on board the ships, the required stacking strength was increased to a superimposed weight of 213,360 kg (470,400 lb) in 2005 per Amendment 3. This value was since maintained in the latest revision of Standard 1496‑1 (2013). Production statistics show that the vast majority of containers have, for many years, been built with a stacking strength at or above the 213,000 kg figure stipulated in ISO 1496‑1. In fact, most major container operators and lessors now cause containers to be built above the required figure, with the most common superimposed strength being 216,000 kg (476,200 lb).

== Scope and systematic structure ==
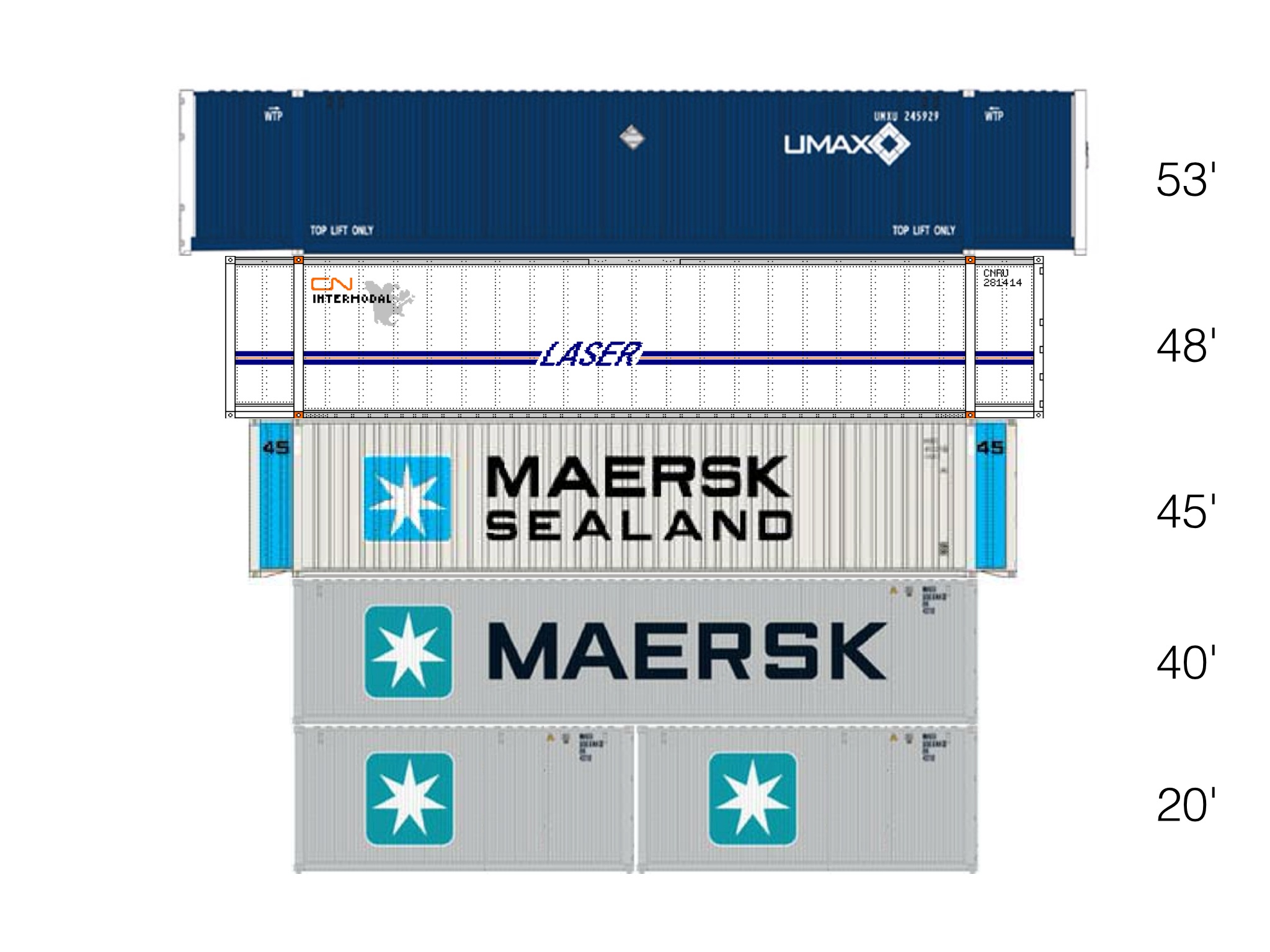
Load bearing of stacked containers shown is at the 40 ft coupling. The two 20‑foot containers at the bottom are rigidly joined with four twistlocks between them, so that they could also be placed higher in the stack. Note: 48-foot and 53-foot units can only be stacked in a 40-foot compliant stack if they are just 8 feet wide, or have special structural provisions to handle their usual 6 inch (15.2 cm) extra width. This is usually not the case. Not shown is the rare, but also possible combination of a 30-foot container coupled to a 10-foot box, in a 40(+) foot long stack.

The ISO 668 standard firstly classifies containers by their length in whole feet for their 'common names', despite all measurement units used being either metric (SI) or officially based on the metric system. The exact standard length of '30-foot' and shorter containers is actually slightly shorter than their nominal length, to accommodate for the space taken up by twist-lock couplers, required for stacking containers of unequal length.

=== Stacking ===
ISO containers up to 40‑feet in length are only required to have the specified stacking strength at their four corners – typically achieved through four strong, vertical (steel) corner posts. Containers shorter than 40‑foot must therefore be horizontally joined together rigidly (with four twist-locks between every two containers, and usually using bridge fittings), to form a rigid combined whole of matching length to longer containers or another same-length joined container-combination (both underneath and above them), to be stackable – supported on the four outside corners of any resulting combination.

ISO standard 668 hence defines the exact lengths of all standard container sizes on purpose in such a way that shorter containers, joined with the also standard sized twistlocks, can always form longer, combined units of an exact length, identical to that of longer containers, or other combinations, such that the corner castings will always line up on top of the four outside corners of another, longer container, or combination, for vertical connecting and securing.

However, this does not apply when stacking 40‑foot and 45‑foot containers in one stack. These can be stacked interchangeably. ISO standards require 45‑foot containers to include a second set of four strong vertical columns (like corner posts), manufactured in them, symmetrically at the 40‑foot length position (meaning 2 1/2 ft (76 cm) inwards from their actual outside corners), to support being stacked interchangeably with 40‑foot containers.

==== ISO designations ====
ISO designation *	Common Name	External dimensions			Minimum internal dimensions **			Maximum gross mass
ISO designation *	Common Name	Length	Height	Width	Length	Height	Width	Maximum gross mass
1EEE ***	45 foot high cube	45 ft / 13.716 m	9' 6" / 2.896 m	8 ft / 2.438 m	13.542 m / 44' 5.15"	2.655 m / 8' 8.5"	2.330 m / 7' 7.73"	36,000 kg **** / 79,370 lbs
1EE ***	45 foot standard	45 ft / 13.716 m	8' 6" / 2.591 m	8 ft / 2.438 m	13.542 m / 44' 5.15"	2.350 m / 7' 8.5"	2.330 m / 7' 7.73"	36,000 kg **** / 79,370 lbs
1AAA	40 foot high cube	40 ft / 12.192 m	9' 6" / 2.896 m	8 ft / 2.438 m	11.998 m / 39' 4.375"	2.655 m / 8' 8.5"	2.330 m / 7' 7.73"	36,000 kg **** / 79,370 lbs
1AA	40 foot standard	40 ft / 12.192 m	8' 6" / 2.591 m	8 ft / 2.438 m	11.998 m / 39' 4.375"	2.350 m / 7' 8.5"	2.330 m / 7' 7.73"	36,000 kg **** / 79,370 lbs
1A	40 foot	40 ft / 12.192 m	8 ft / 2.438 m	8 ft / 2.438 m	11.998 m / 39' 4.375"	2.197 m / 7' 2.5"	2.330 m / 7' 7.73"	36,000 kg **** / 79,370 lbs
1BBB	30 foot high cube	29' 11.25" / 9.125 m	9' 6" / 2.896 m	8 ft / 2.438 m	8.931 m / 29' 3.6"	2.655 m / 8' 8.5"	2.330 m / 7' 7.73"	36,000 kg **** / 79,370 lbs
1BB	30 foot standard	29' 11.25" / 9.125 m	8' 6" / 2.591 m	8 ft / 2.438 m	8.931 m / 29' 3.6"	2.350 m / 7' 8.5"	2.330 m / 7' 7.73"	36,000 kg **** / 79,370 lbs
1B	30 foot	29' 11.25" / 9.125 m	8 ft / 2.438 m	8 ft / 2.438 m	8.931 m / 29' 3.6"	2.197 m / 7' 2.5"	2.330 m / 7' 7.73"	36,000 kg **** / 79,370 lbs
1CCC	20 foot high cube	19' 10.5" / 6.058 m	9' 6" / 2.896 m	8 ft / 2.438 m	5.867 m / 19' 3"	2.655 m / 8' 8.5"	2.330 m / 7' 7.73"	36,000 kg **** / 79,370 lbs
1CC	20 foot standard	19' 10.5" / 6.058 m	8' 6" / 2.591 m	8 ft / 2.438 m	5.867 m / 19' 3"	2.350 m / 7' 8.5"	2.330 m / 7' 7.73"	36,000 kg **** / 79,370 lbs
1C	20 foot	19' 10.5" / 6.058 m	8 ft / 2.438 m	8 ft / 2.438 m	5.867 m / 19' 3"	2.197 m / 7' 2.5"	2.330 m / 7' 7.73"	36,000 kg **** / 79,370 lbs
1D	10 foot	9' 9.75" / 2.991 m	8 ft / 2.438 m	8 ft / 2.438 m	2.802 m / 9' 2.3"	2.197 m / 7' 2.5"	2.330 m / 7' 7.73"	10,160 kg / 22,400 lbs
1E *****	6½ foot	6' 5.5" / 1.968 m	8 ft / 2.438 m	8 ft / 2.438 m	1.778 m / 5' 10"	2.197 m / 7' 2.5"	2.330 m / 7' 7.73"	7,110 kg / 15,700 lbs
1F *****	5 foot	4' 9.5" / 1.460 m	8 ft / 2.438 m	8 ft / 2.438 m	1.270 m / 4' 2"	2.197 m / 7' 2.5"	2.330 m / 7' 7.73"	5,080 kg / 11,200 lbs
* The standard also recognises containers under 8 feet in height, designated as 1AX, 1BX, 1CX and 1DX, with specifications the same as other containers of their length. ** Minimum internal dimensions were previously defined by ISO standard 1894: "General purpose series 1 freight containers – Minimum internal dimensions" (2nd edition; 1979)
*** 45-foot containers were added to the standard per Amendment 2 of 2005.
**** The maximum gross mass rating of standard containers of all sizes (except 10-ft length) was increased from 30,480 kg (67,200 lb) to 36,000 kg (79,370 lb), per Amendment 2 to ISO 668 (in 2016). The maximum gross mass rating of 20- and 30-foot units was earlier uprated with Amendment 1 of 2005. Until then, the MGW for 20-ft units was 24,000 kg (52,910 lb), and for 30-ft units 25,400 kg (56,000 lb).
***** 6 1/2- and 5-foot containers (type 1E and 1F) are not in the current edition ISO 668 standard, but were standardized in previous editions, and are still made. (Note: The U.S. Army uses these under the names of 'tricons' and 'quadcons' respectively.) The so-called width of these small-size containers may be perceived as their length, as it is their greatest horizontal dimension, and their doors are frequently in the short end(s).

== See also ==
- ISO 6346 – standard covering the coding, identification and marking of intermodal containers
