= Twistlock =

Standardized rotating connector for securing intermodal containers

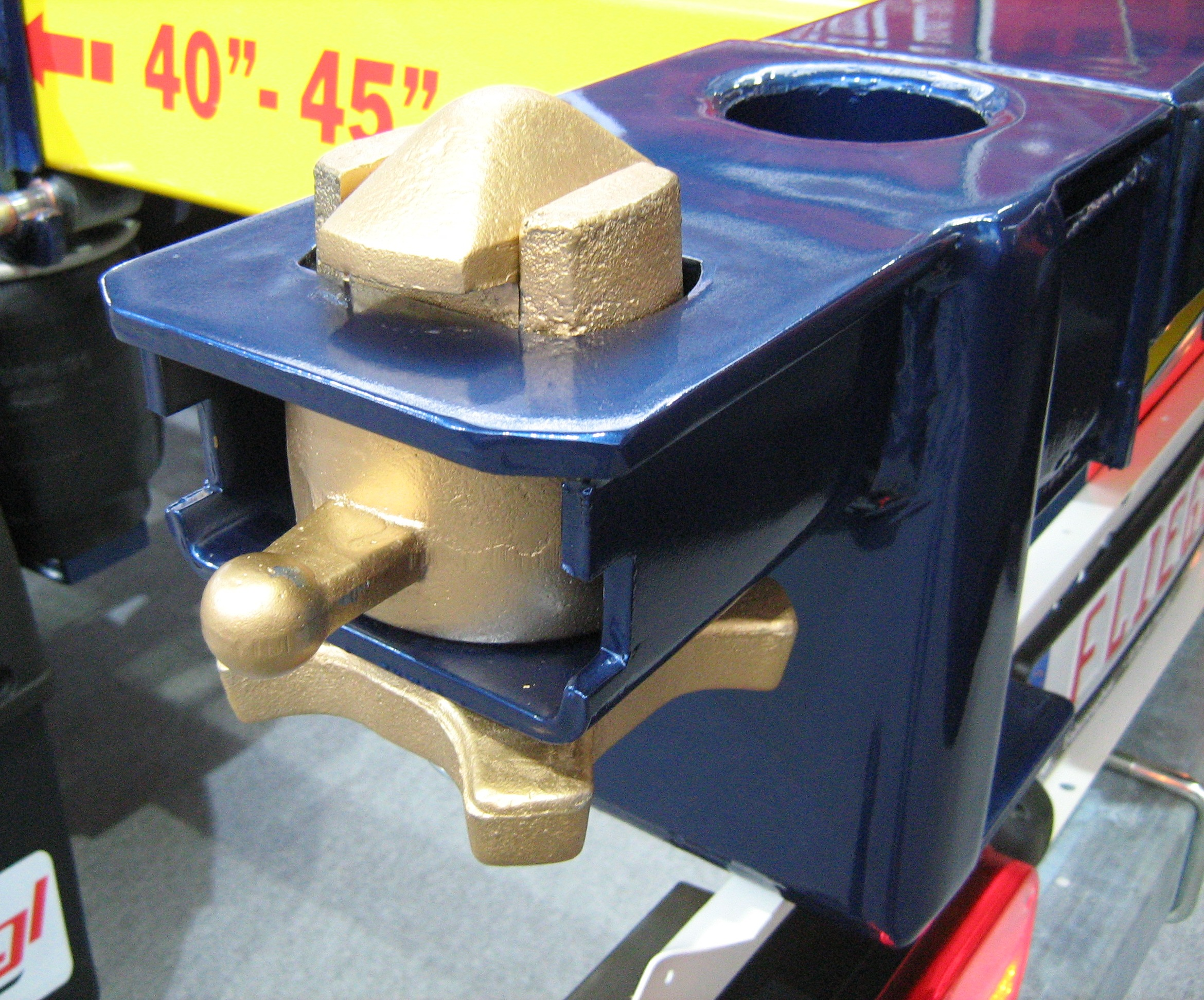
Close-up of twistlock on a rear corner of a German semi-trailer

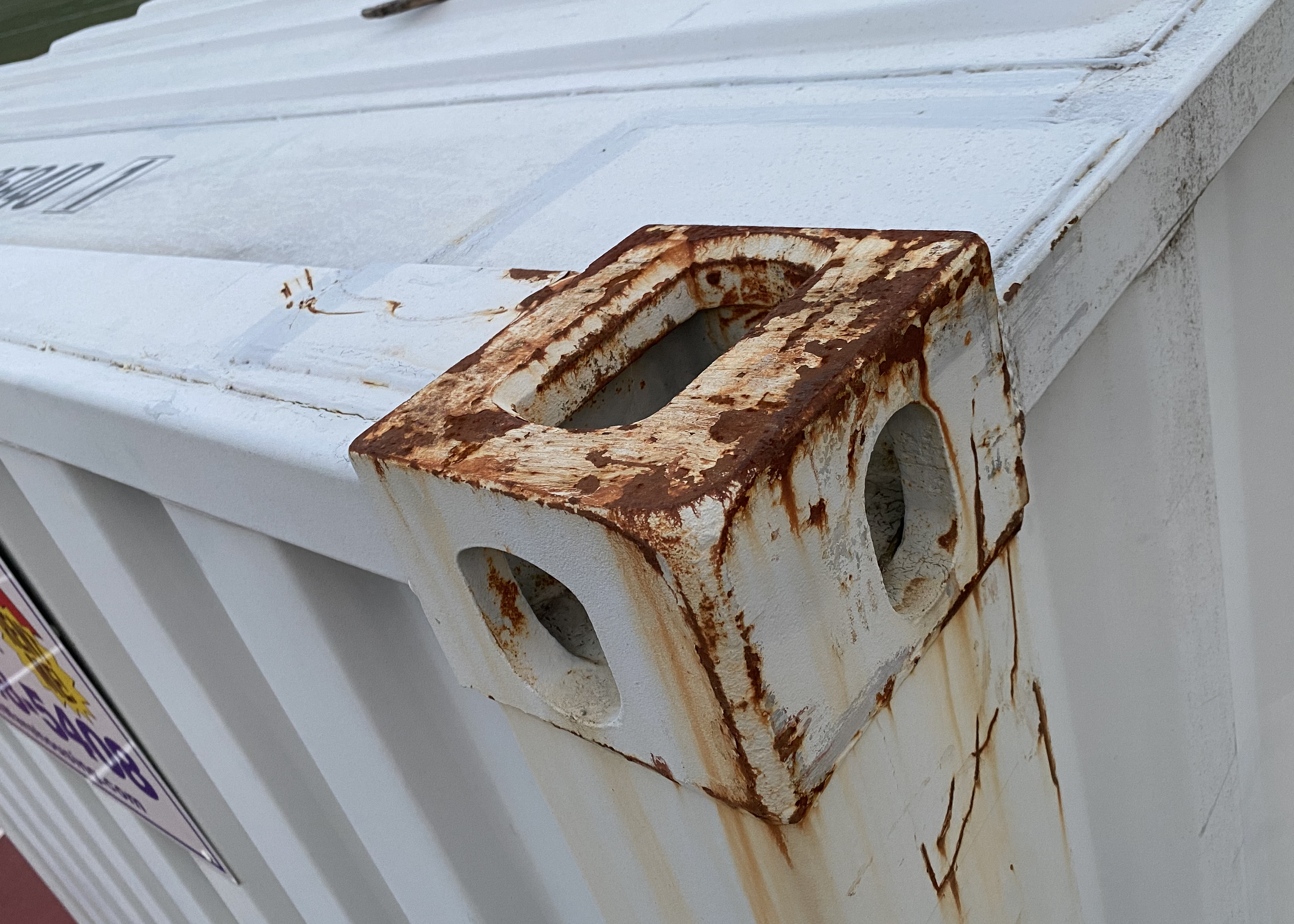
Close up of top corner casting on an ISO shipping container. The twistlock proper is inserted through the large oval hole in the top of upper, and the bottom of the lower corner castings.

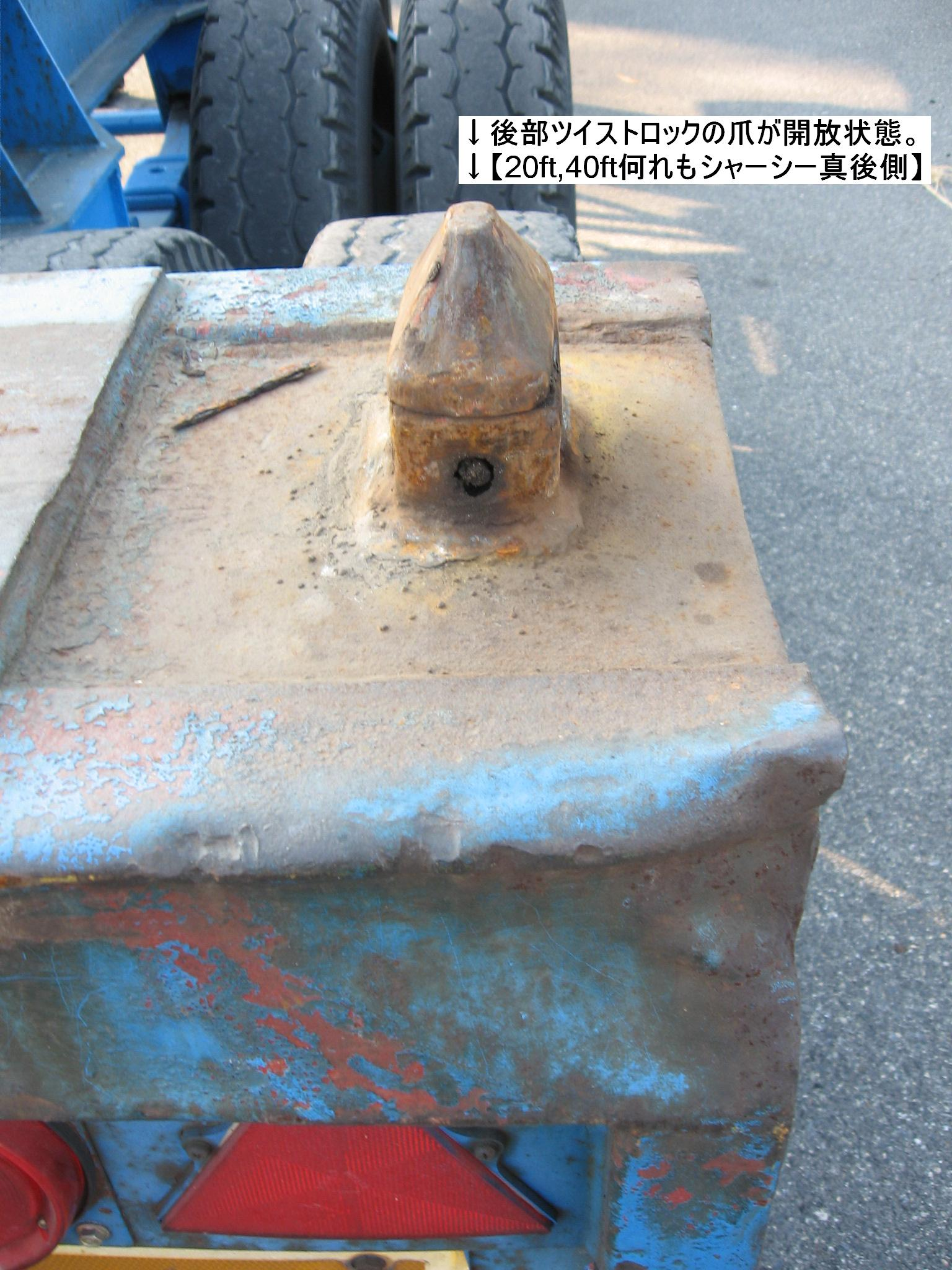
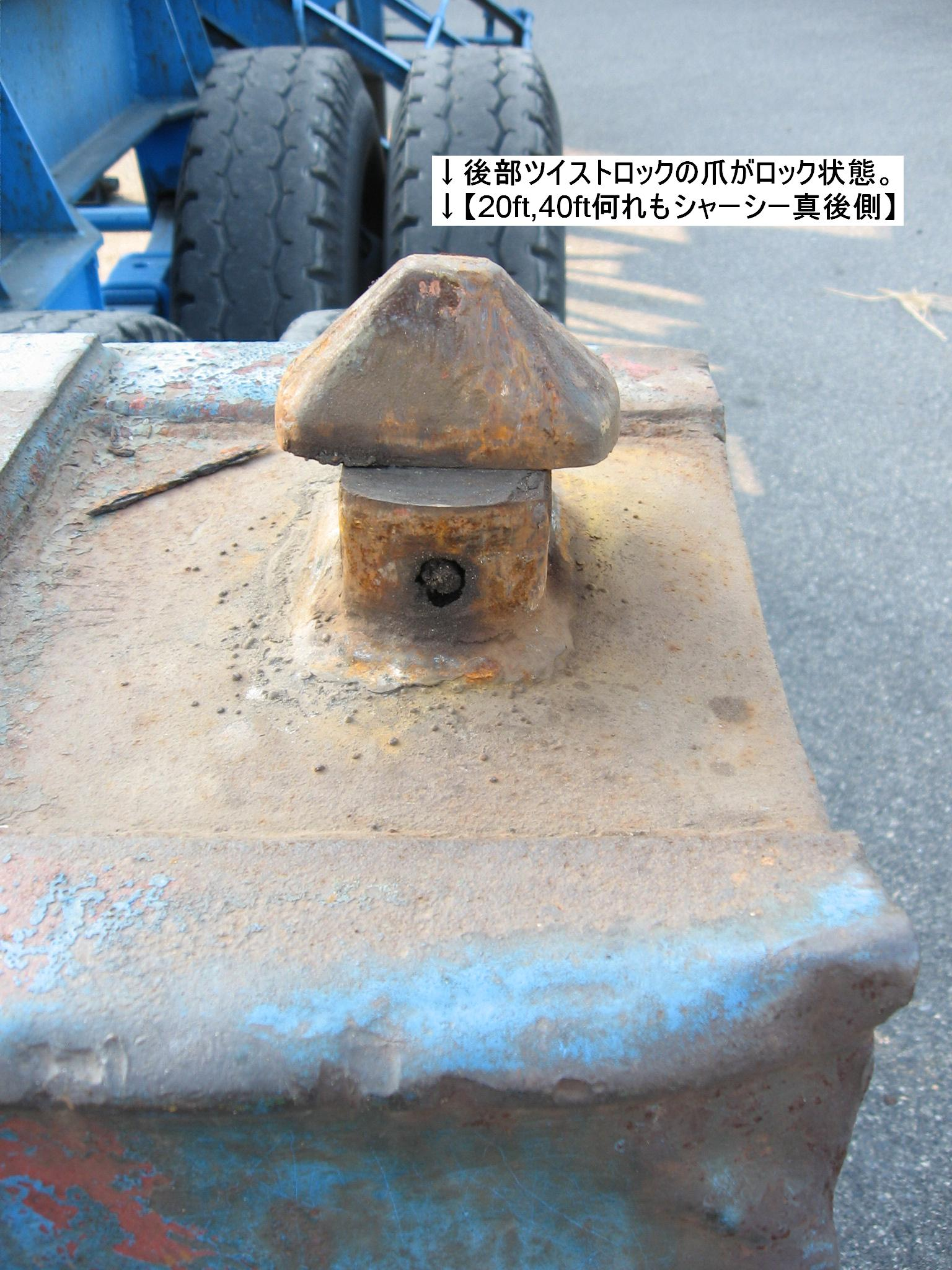
Twistlock, unlocked v. locked position.

A twistlock or twist lock, together with matching corner castings, as defined in norms including ISO 1161:1984, form a standardized (rotating) connector system, for connecting and securing intermodal, and predominantly ISO-standard international shipping containers. The primary uses are to securely stack containers, for locking them into place on a container ship, semi-trailer or rail carriage, and for lifting and handling by specific container-handling equipment, like straddle carriers, reach stackers, container-handling forklifts, sidelifters, and various types of container cranes.

Twist-locks also have to be used when stacking containers shorter than 40 feet (12 m) together with 40‑foot and longer containers. Containers shorter than 40 feet containers must be joined together horizontally with twist-locks, to form a rigid combined whole 40 feet in length, to make them stackable and be able to support and be supported by an ISO standard 40- or 45‑foot container stacked underneath or above them. (Note: ISO standard 668 defines the exact lengths of all standard container sizes deliberately such that shorter containers, joined horizontally with standard-size twistlocks, can always form longer, rigid units, that exactly match the length of longer containers, to make them stackable on the four outside, load-bearing corners of another longer container, or same-length unit-combination.) (Note: To support being stacked interchangeably with 40‑foot containers, ISO standard 45‑foot or other overlength containers are required to integrate a second set of four strong vertical (steel) columns (similar to corner posts) at the 40‑foot length, symmetrically manufactured into them, 2 1/2 feet (76 cm) inwards from their outside corners.)

== Description ==
The twistlock was developed in Spokane, Washington, in the 1950s by transport engineer Keith Tantlinger. The relative obscurity of this invention belies its importance to a more efficient world trade and transport, as the Tantlinger lock made handling and stacking standard containers much easier. Tantlinger later released his patent royalty-free, which enabled the twist-lock to become an industry and international standard.

A major advantage of this approach to attachment is that containers, which may be stored or transported without being inspected for months at a time, do not require any maintenance in order to function effectively. Even with long-term exposure to the weather the container remains as simple to move as ever. Only when corrosion is very extensive (to the extent of being easily visible) does the twistlock become dangerous to move the crate. The male part (which is more exposed and susceptible to damage) is placed on vehicles and equipment that are inspected very frequently, and will work with all standard containers.

== Mechanism ==
The female part of the connector is the 7×7×4 1/2 in (180×180×110 mm) corner casting, which forms each of the eight corners, welded to the container itself, and has no moving parts, only an oval hole in the tops of the four upper corners, and in the bottom of the four lower corners. The hole is an oval 4.9 in (124.5 mm) on the long axis with two flat sides 2.5 in (63.5 mm) apart. The male component is the twistlock, which is fitted to cranes and transport bases. This can be inserted through the hole (it is roughly 4.1 in or 104.1 mm long and 2.2 in or 55.9 mm wide), and then the top portion (normally pointed to make insertion easier) is rotated 90°, so that it cannot be withdrawn. The mechanism is similar to that of a Kensington lock, but of a much larger size. The maximum size and position of the holes in the connector defined in the original patent and is now defined in international standard ISO 1161:2016. The tensile strength of a twistlock is rated at either 20 or 25 tonnes (19.7 or 24.6 long tons; 22.0 or 27.6 short tons).

Some twistlocks have built-in levers or mechanisms, while simpler versions require tools for installation or removal. Some twistlocks are permanently installed (e.g., on the decks of container ships or on the beds of semi-trailers), while others are temporarily installed and removed as needed, for instance to stack containers securely on ships, or in storage yards.

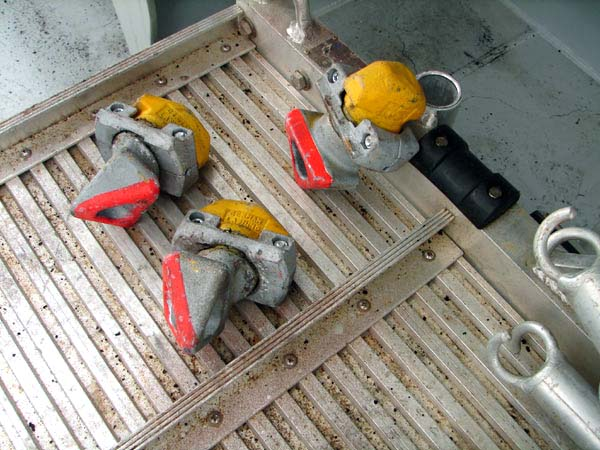
Mid-locks are manually attached to the bottom corners of an upper container, and will automatically lock into the top corners of the lower container when stacked.

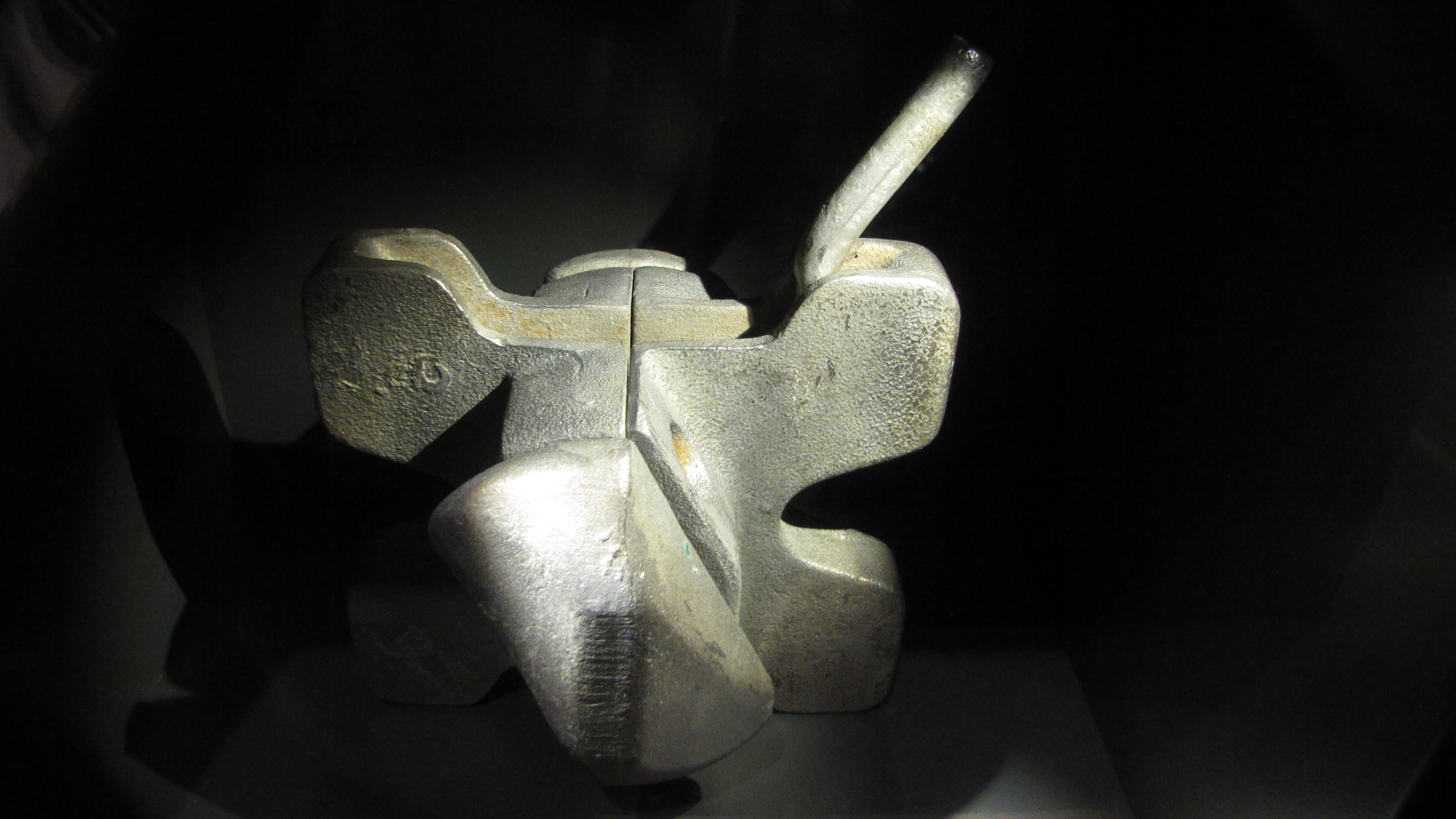
Closeup of twistlock at Maritime Museum of Finland

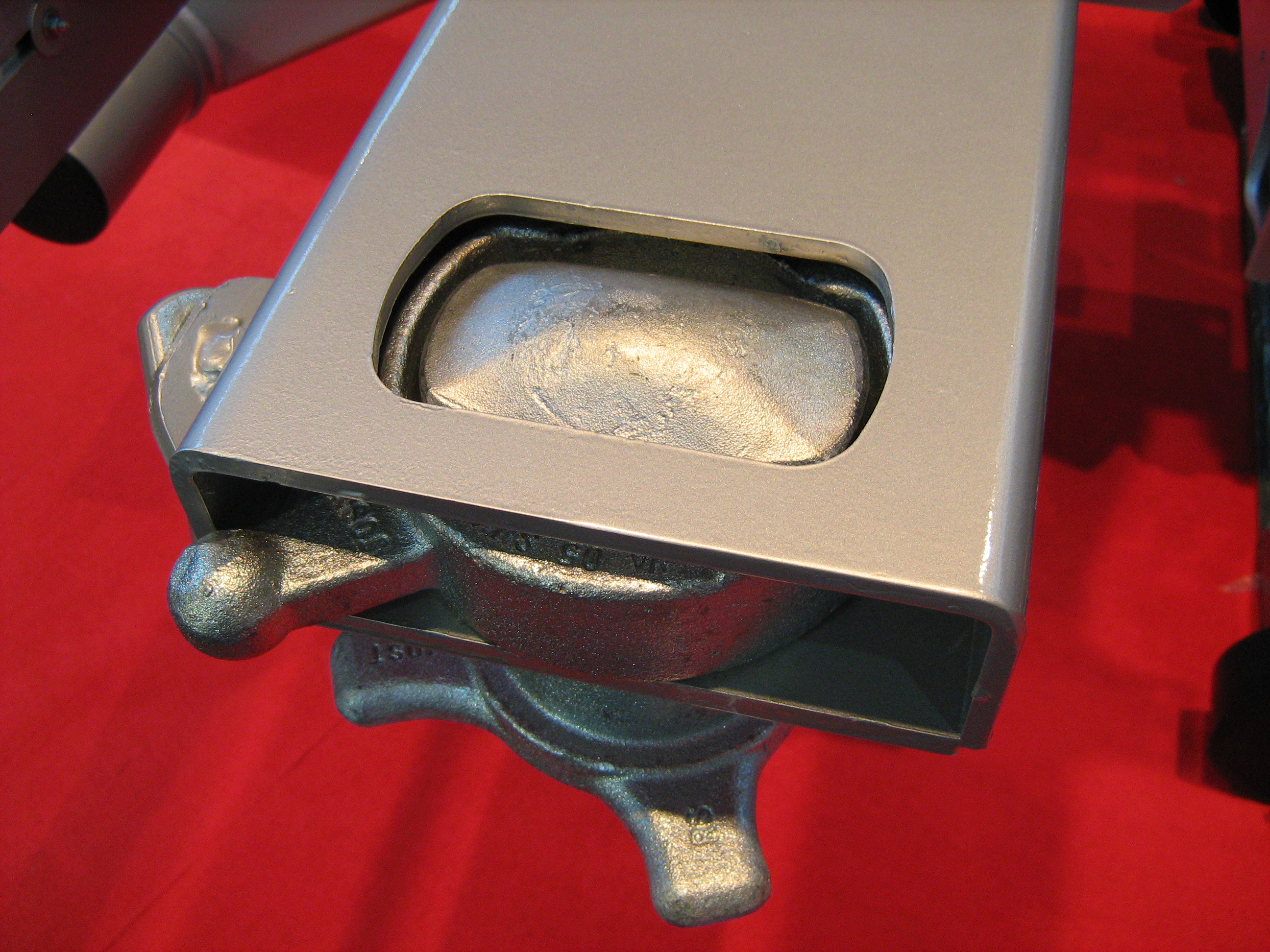
High-quality retractable twistlock

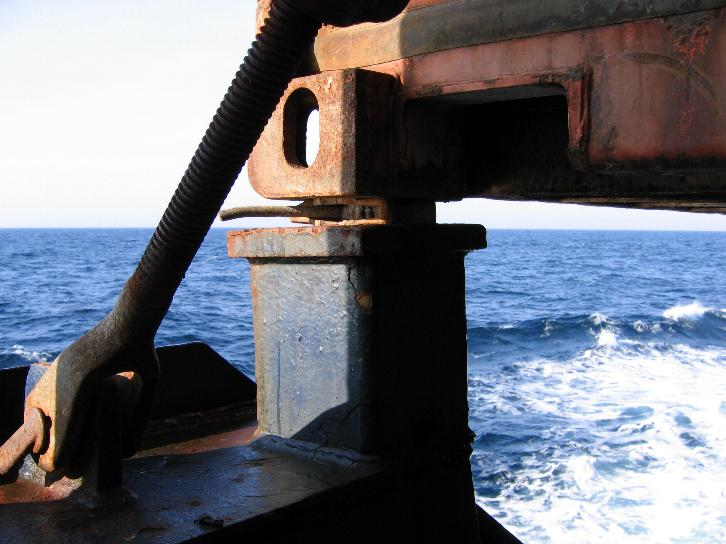
Twistlock engaged with shipping container at sea

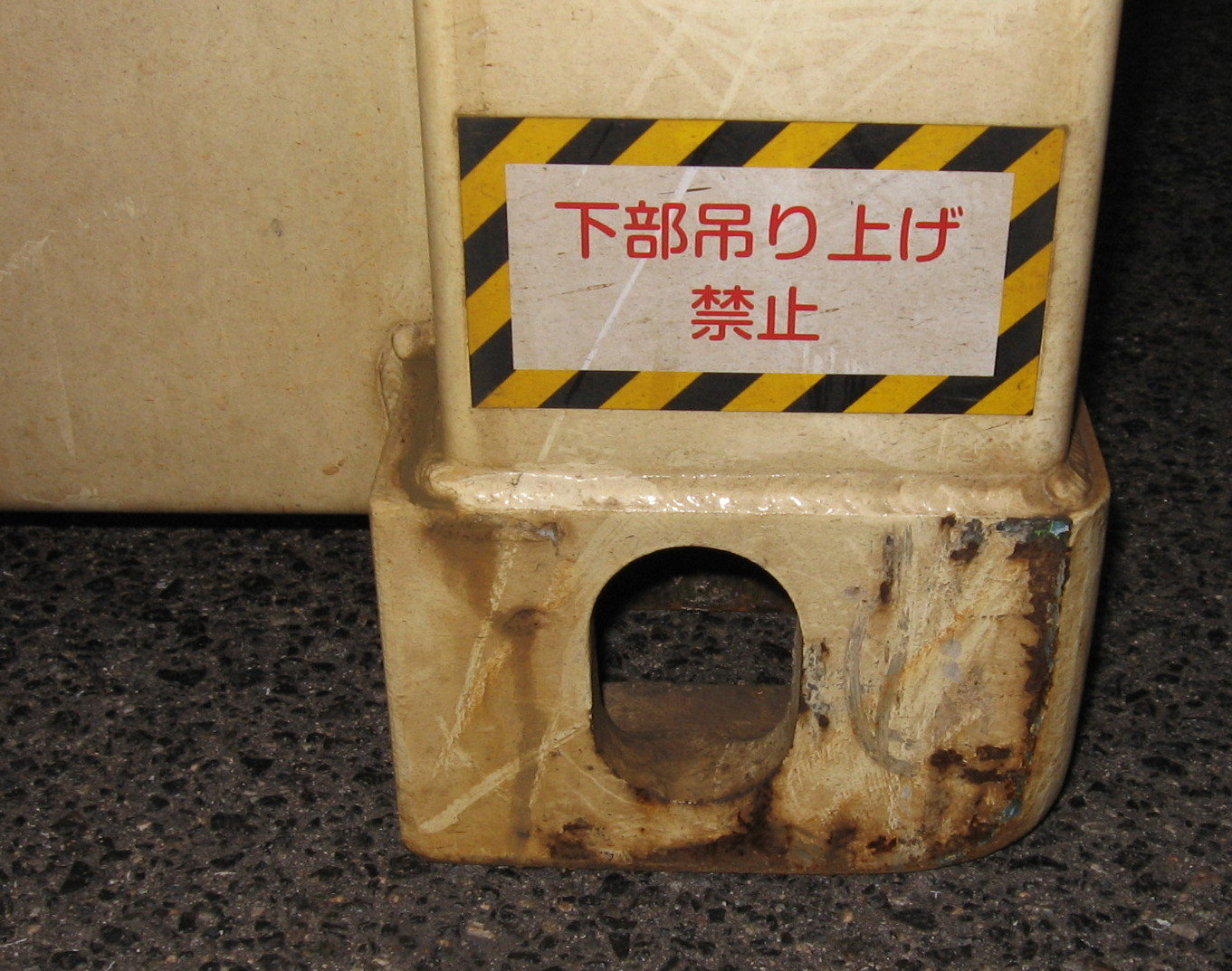
Close-up of ISO standard container bottom corner casting. Twistlocks engage through a large oval hole on the bottom

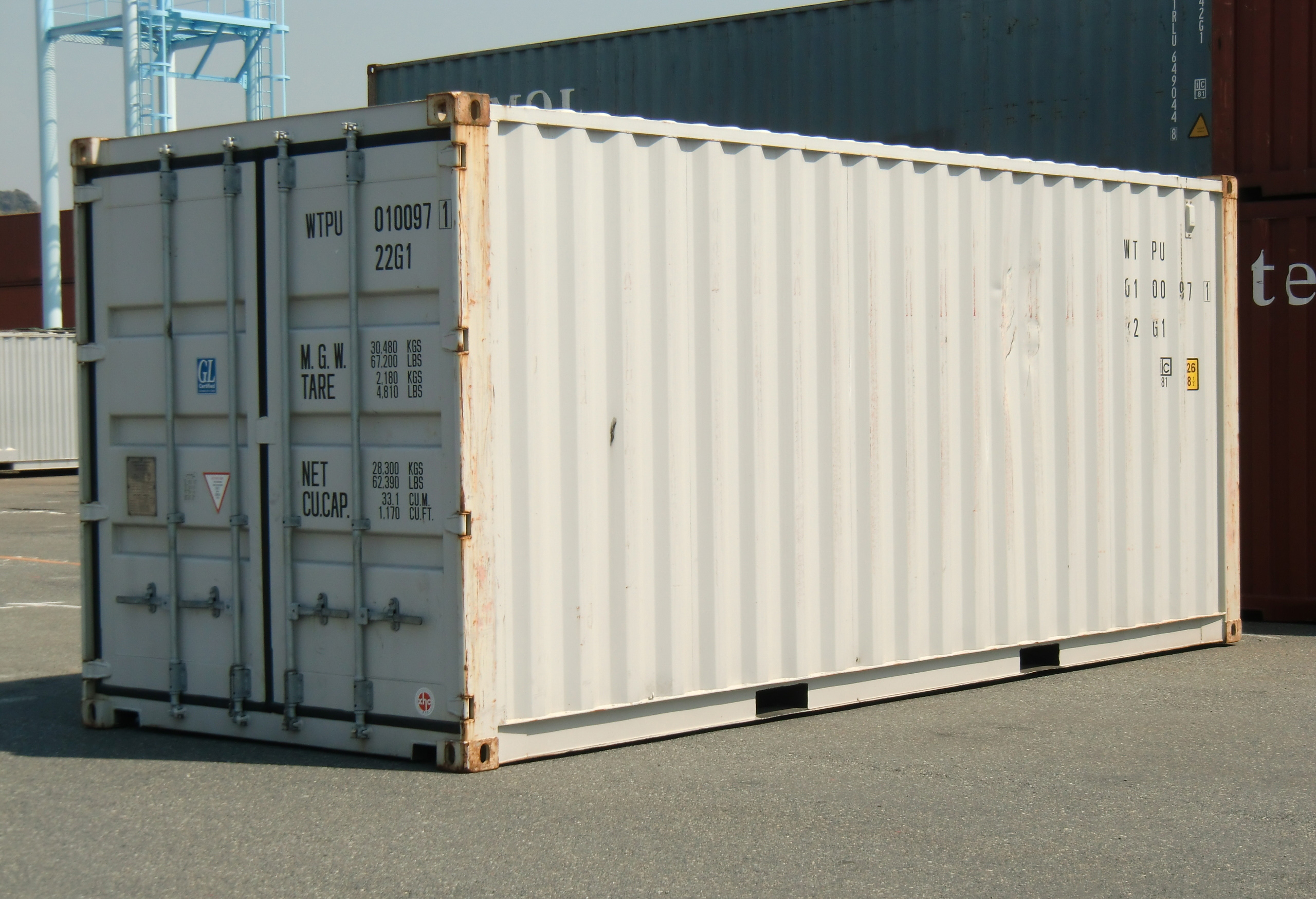
Standard 20-foot ISO shipping container with standard corner castings on each of its eight corners.

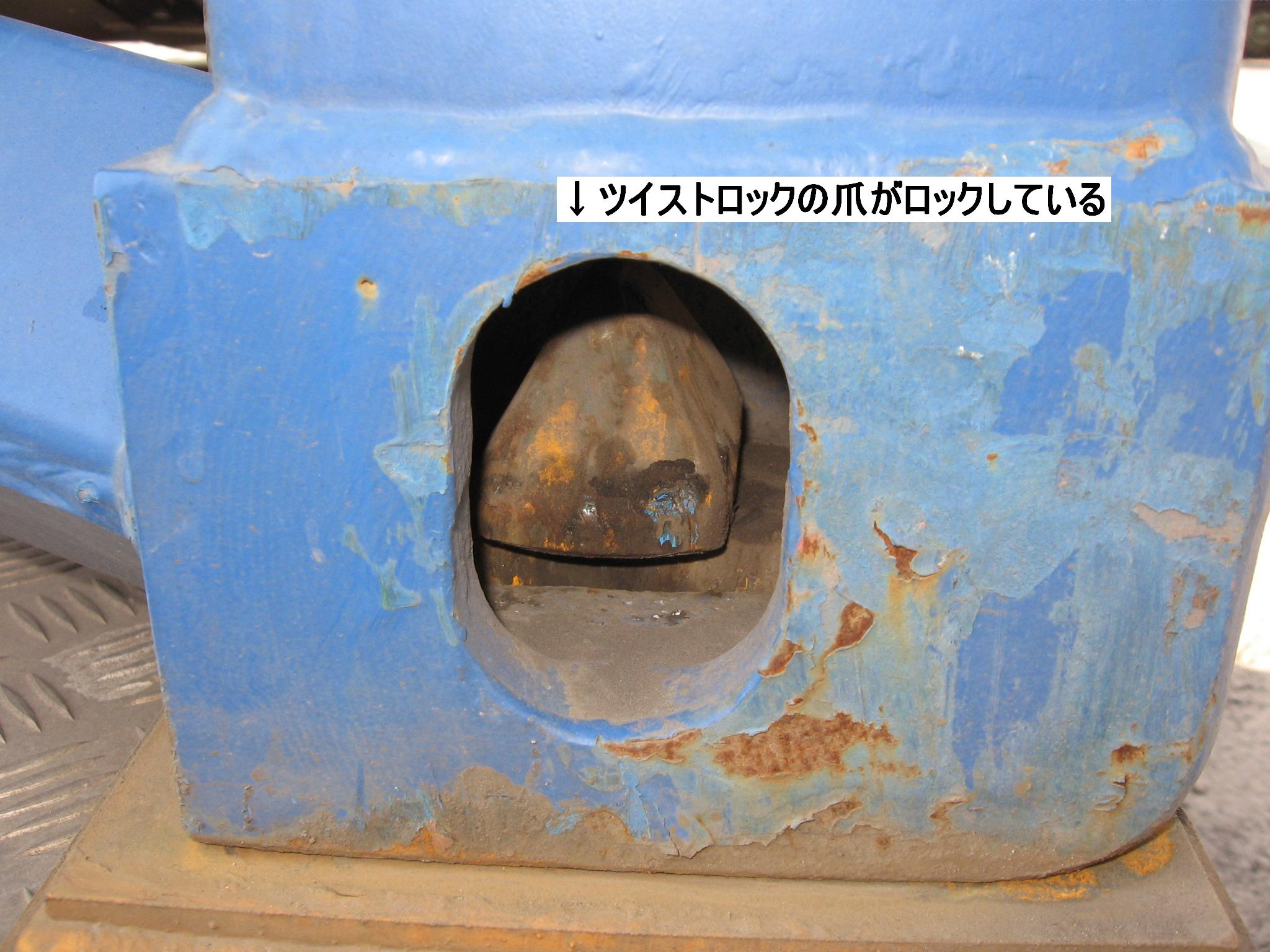
Close-up of corner casting with twist-lock in place and locked.]

== Applications ==
Double male twistlocks (midlocks) are also used to lock two stacked containers vertically, for example in double-stack rail transport or on well cars.

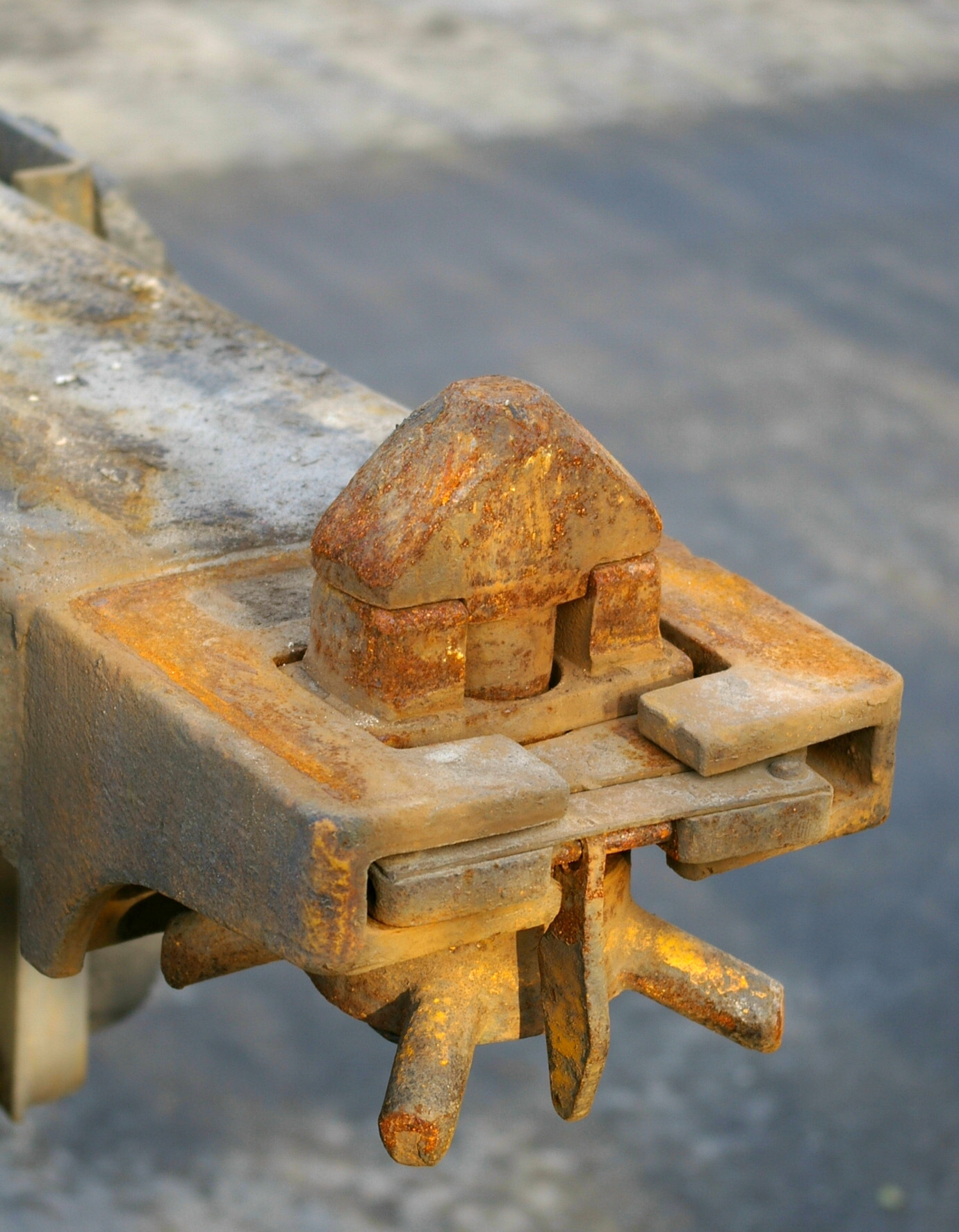
Rusty twistlock on a semi-trailer

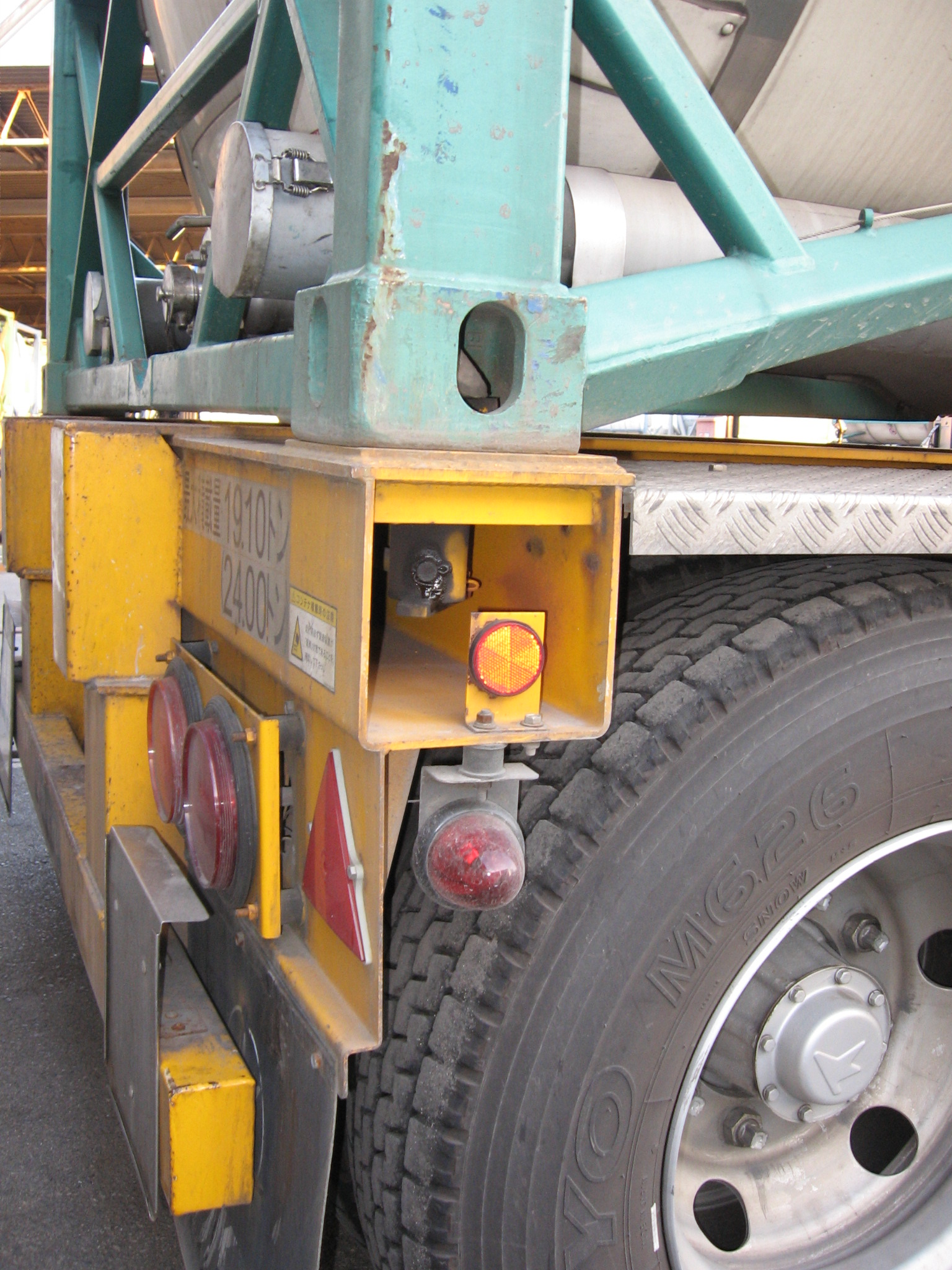
Twistlock attachment to a trailer (Japan)

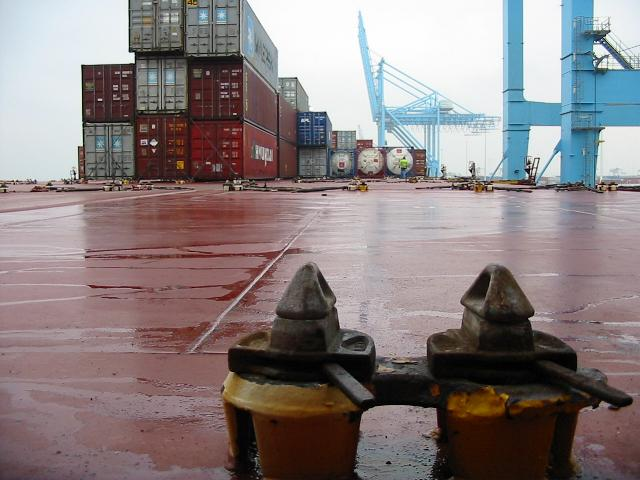
First level of twistlocks on the deck of a container ship

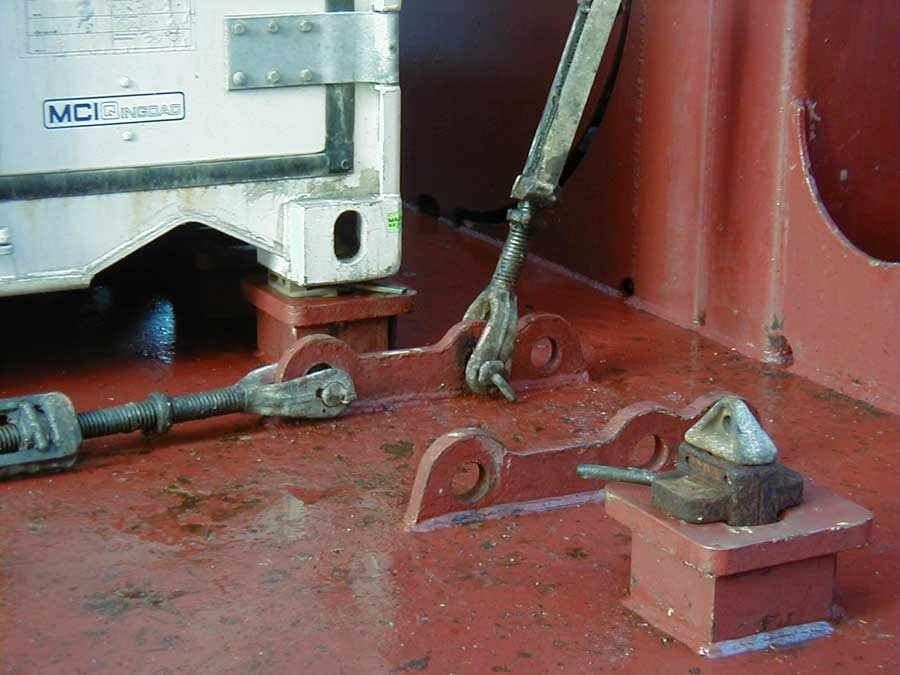
Twistlocks on deck of container ship. Foreground: unlocked; background: locked. The turnbuckles are "lashing rods" used for shoring

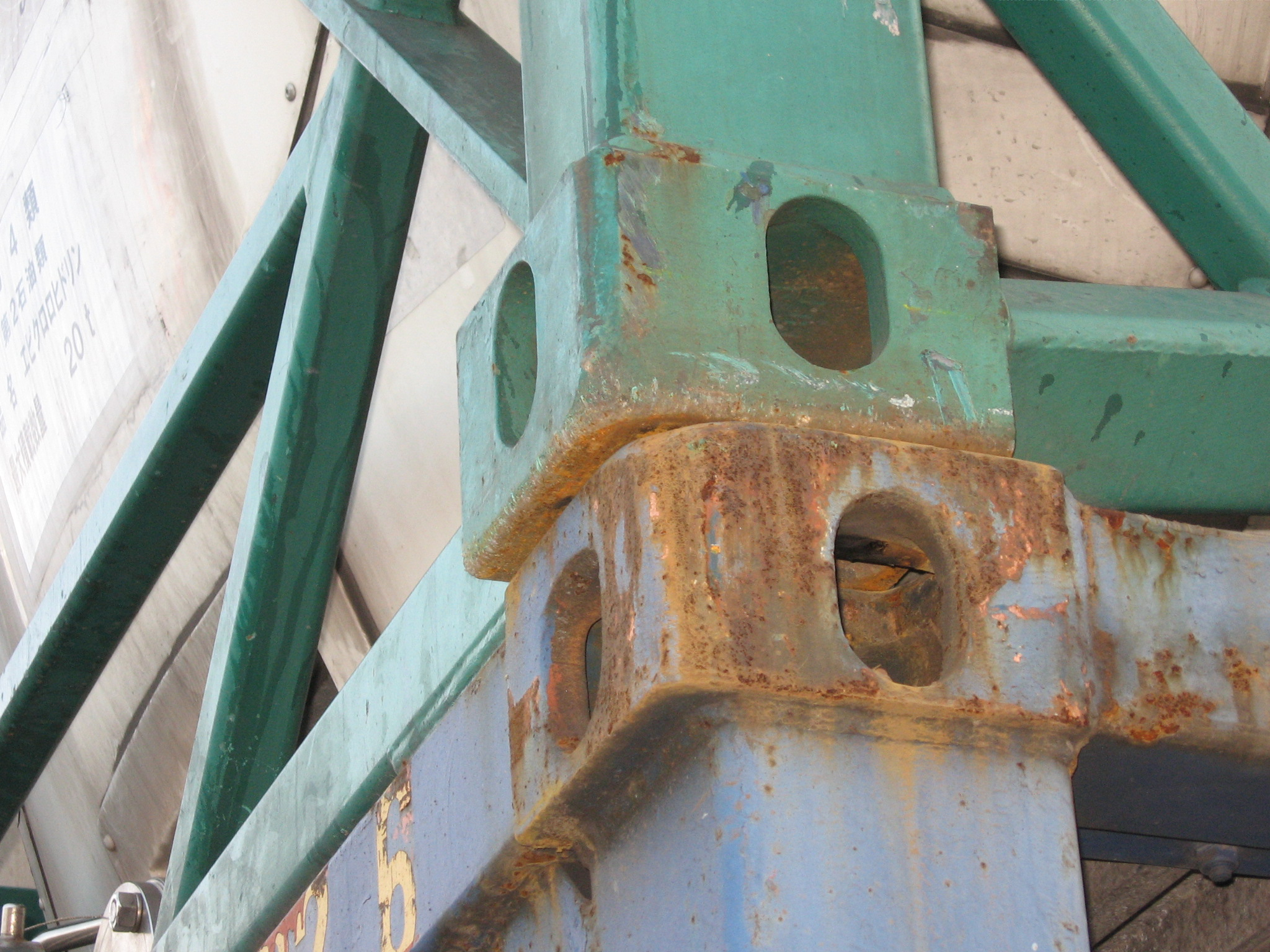
Loosely stacked tank containers, without twistlocks to tie their corners together, illustrating how easily the top one might shift off the bottom one

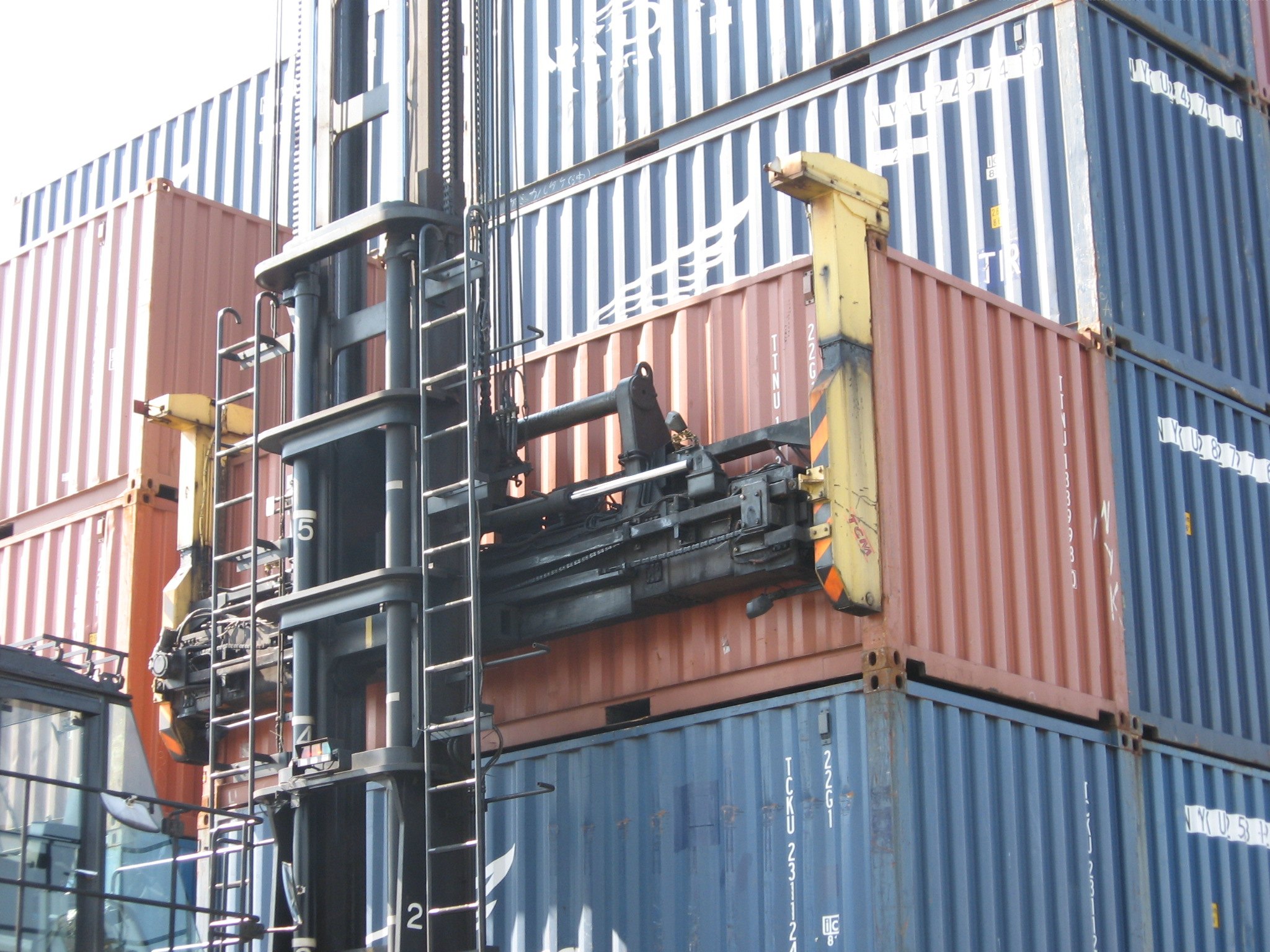
Skystacker attaching to just two top corner castings on one side of 20-foot container

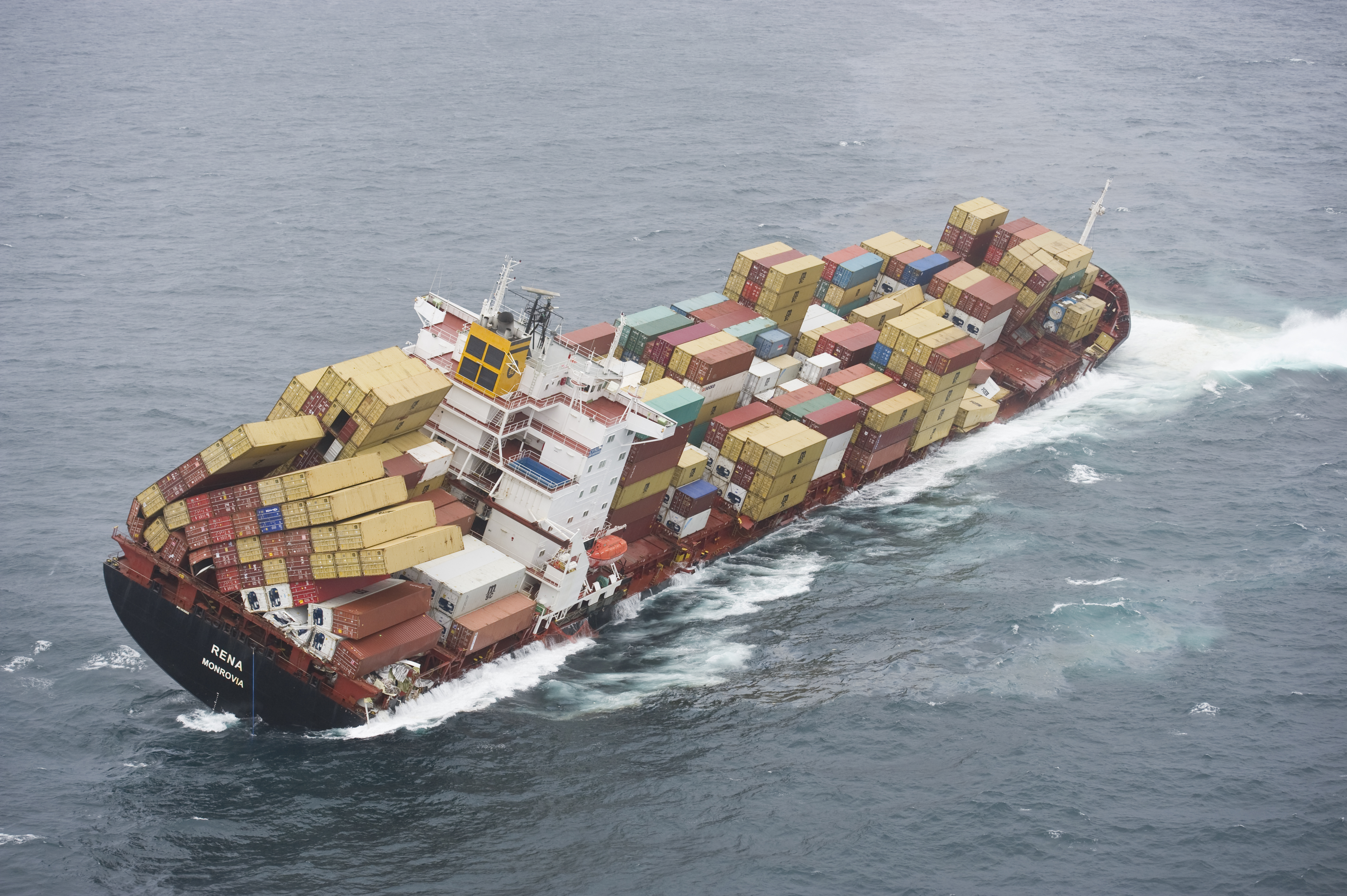
Grounded container ship, the MV Rena off New Zealand, 5 October 2011. Some of the bottom containers collapsed, but many twistlocks held, resulting in the cargo stacks falling over.

== Bibliography ==
- Peck and Hale (2000). "Container Stowage and Securing Systems" (PDF). West Sayville, NY: Peck & Hale. Archived from the original (PDF) on 2011-07-15.
- Levinson, Marc (2006). The Box: How the Shipping Container Made the World Smaller and the World Economy Bigger. Princeton, N.J: Princeton University Press. ISBN 0-691-12324-1.
- Nichols, C. Reid; Williams, Robert G. (November 2008). Encyclopedia of Marine Science. Infobase Publishing. p. 119. ISBN 978-0-8160-5022-2.
- SPTA-company (November 2008). SPTA.su. Infobase Publishing. p. 119. ISBN 978-0-8160-5022-2.
