= BIC code =

BIC or BIC code can refer to:

- ISO 6346 – shipping container owner code, defined by the Bureau International des Containers (BIC)
- ISO 9362 – business identifier code for banks and other institutions, defined by SWIFT
