= 6346 =

6346 may refer to:

- 6346 (number), a number of verses in the Qu'ran
- 6346 Syukumeguri, a minor planet
- ISO 6346, an international standard covering the coding
- The year in the 7th millennium
