= Intermodal freight transport =

Cargo transport using multiple containers

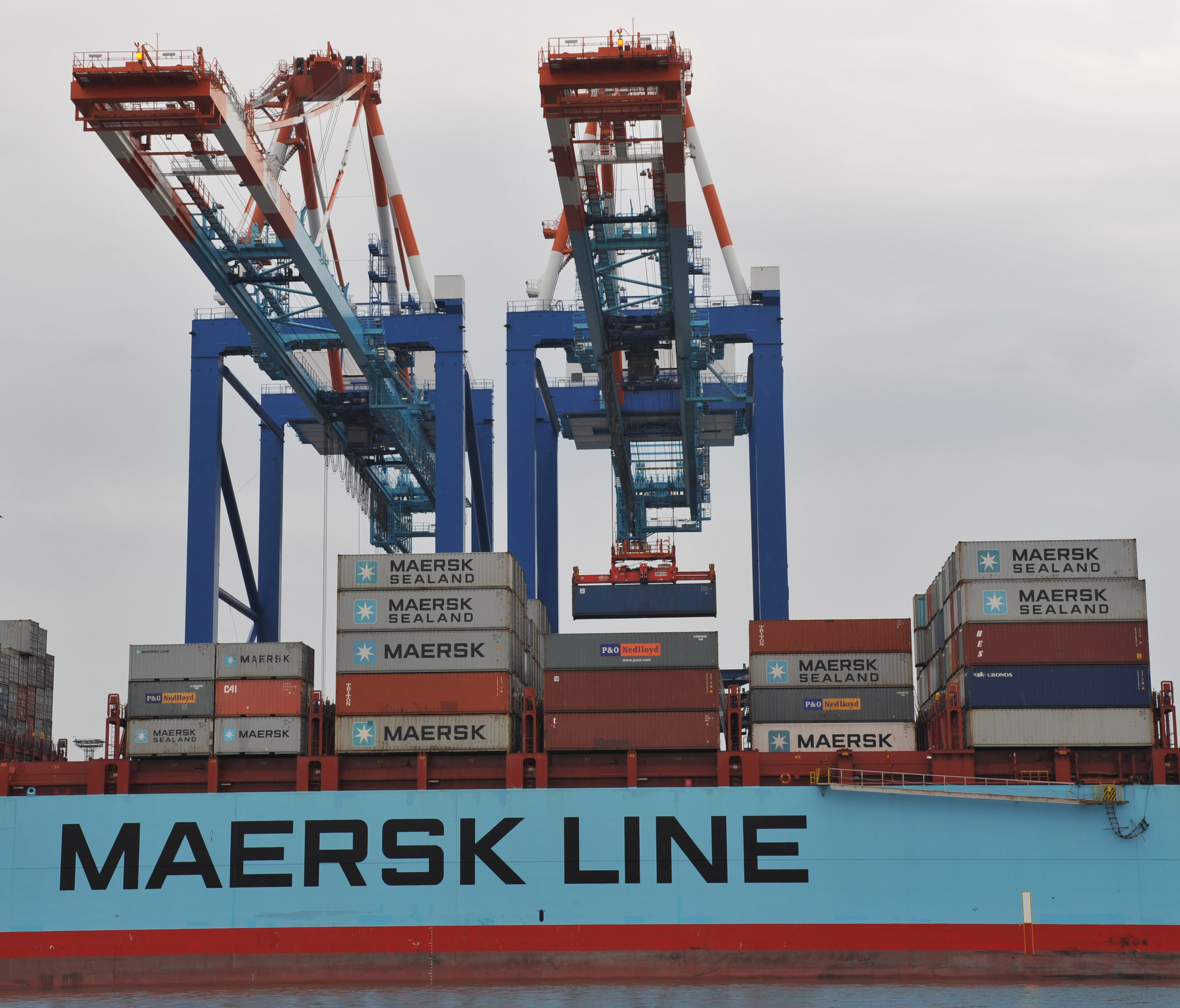
Containers being transferred to a cargo ship at the container terminal in Bremerhaven, Bremen, Germany

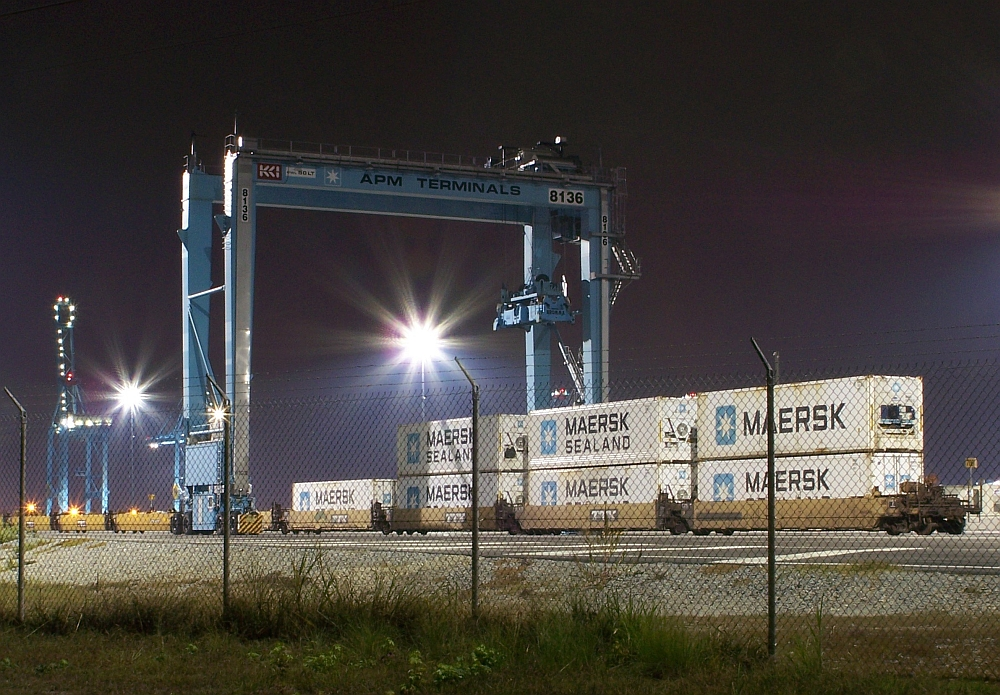
Intermodal ship-to-rail transfer of containerized cargos at terminals in Portsmouth, Virginia, United States

Intermodal freight transport is a transport system involving the transportation of goods when at least two means of transport are used. This means that two or more different transport modes are involved without changing load units during the time of transportation. The main idea behind intermodal transport is to utilize the strengths of different transport modes in one integrated transport chain, thereby improving the economic performance. It has been argued that economic performance is improved because the most suitable transport mode is used on each part of a trip. The main advantage of intermodal transport solutions is their comparatively low external costs.

According to Forkenbrock (2001), the external cost of an intermodal train per tonne-km is only 28 % of the external cost of a general freight truck. However, the difference in external cost might be even greater than this as the cost of congestion was not included in the calculations. Because intermodal freight transport is less energy intensive than freight transport by road, it is considered to be an important contribution to achieve a sustainable European transport sector (European Commission, 2009). Intermodal freight transport has therefore been promoted by policymakers on all levels. However, the market share of intermodal freight transport has not developed as positively as expected.

IFT reduces cargo handling, and so improves security, reduces damage and loss, and allows freight to be transported faster. Reduced costs over road trucking is the key benefit for inter-continental use. This may be offset by reduced timings for road transport over shorter distances.

== Origins ==
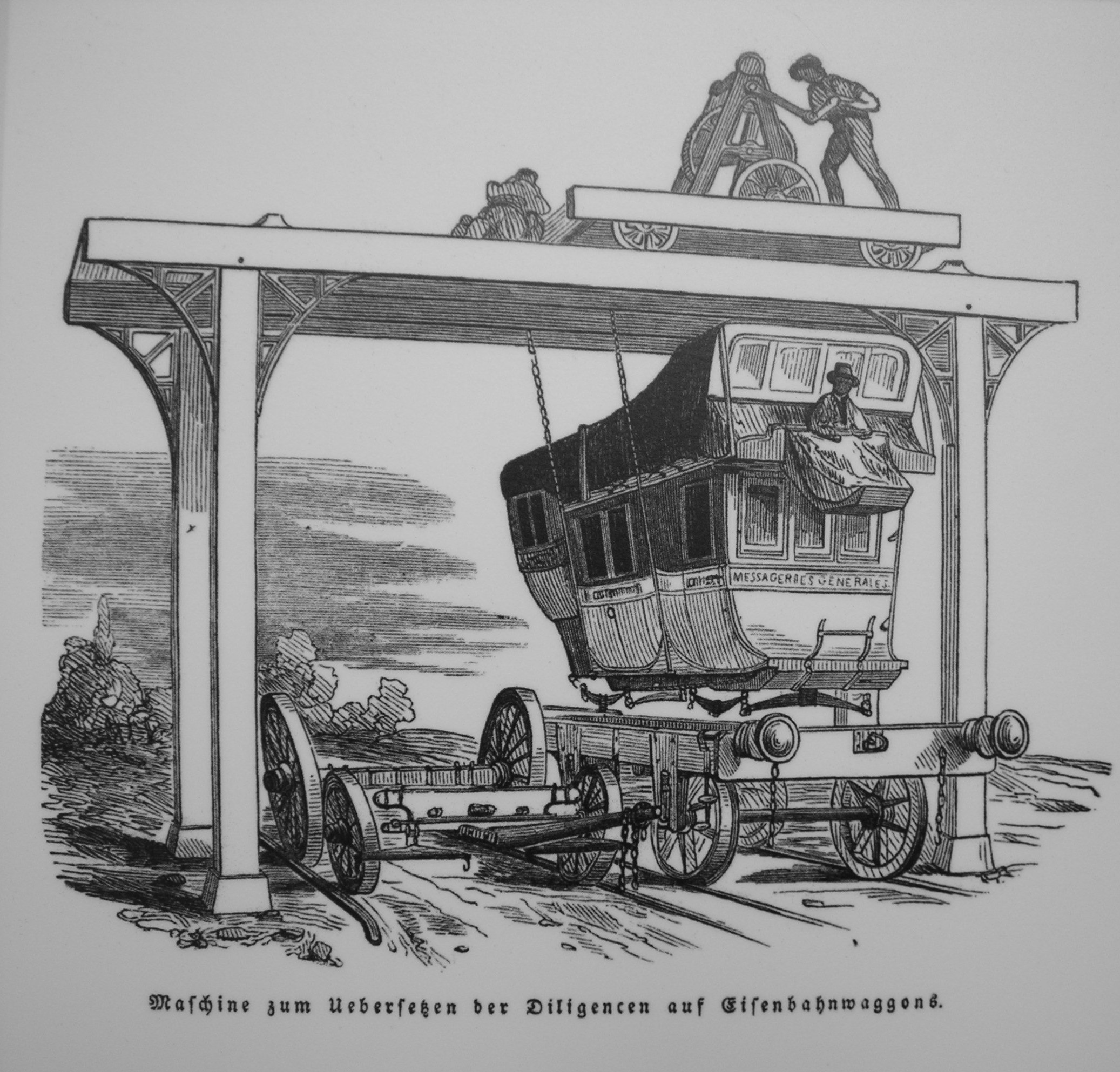
A stagecoach transferred to a railroad car with a gantry crane, an example of early intermodal freight transport by the French Mail in 1844; the drawing is exhibited in Deutsches Museum Verkehrszentrum in Munich.

Intermodal transportation has its origin in 18th century England and predates the railways. Some of the earliest containers were those used for shipping coal on the Bridgewater Canal in England in the 1780s. Coal containers (called "loose boxes" or "tubs") were soon deployed on the early canals and railways and were used for road/rail transfers (road at the time meaning horse-drawn vehicles).

Wooden coal containers were first used on the railways in the 1830s on the Liverpool and Manchester Railway. In 1841, Isambard Kingdom Brunel introduced iron containers to move coal from the vale of Neath to Swansea Docks. By the outbreak of the First World War the Great Eastern Railway was using wooden containers to trans-ship passenger luggage between trains and sailings via the port of Harwich.

The early 1900s saw the first adoption of covered containers, primarily for the movement of furniture and intermodal freight between road and rail. A lack of standards limited the value of this service and this in turn drove standardisation. In the U.S. such containers, known as "lift vans", were in use from as early as 1911.

== Intermodal container ==
=== Early containers ===
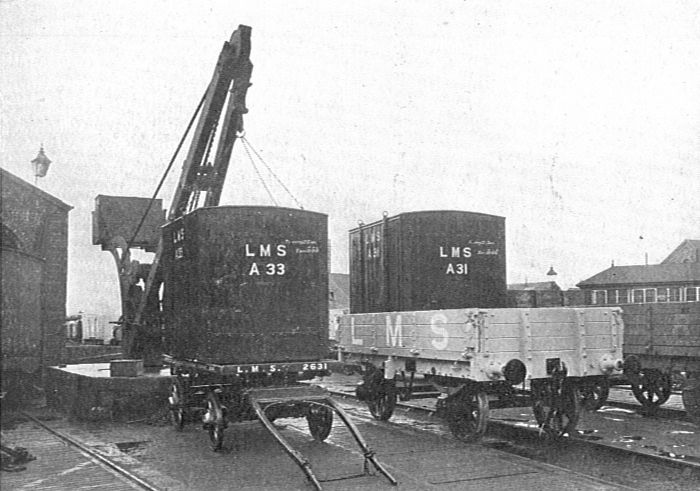
Transferring freight containers on the London, Midland and Scottish Railway in 1928

In the United Kingdom, containers were first standardised by the Railway Clearing House (RCH) in the 1920s, allowing both railway-owned and privately owned vehicles to be carried on standard container flats. By modern standards these containers were small, being 1.5 or 3.0 meters (4.9 or 9.8 ft) long, normally wooden and with a curved roof and insufficient strength for stacking. From 1928 the London, Midland & Scottish Railway offered "door to door" intermodal road-rail services using these containers. This standard failed to become popular outside the United Kingdom.

Pallets made their first major appearance during World War II, when the United States military assembled freight on pallets, allowing fast transfer between warehouses, trucks, trains, ships, and aircraft. Because no freight handling was required, fewer personnel were needed and loading times were decreased.

Truck trailers were first carried by railway before World War II, an arrangement often called "piggyback", by the small Class I railroad, the Chicago Great Western in 1936. The Canadian Pacific Railway was a pioneer in piggyback transport, becoming the first major North American railway to introduce the service in 1952. In the United Kingdom, the big four railway companies offered services using standard RCH containers that could be craned on and off the back of trucks. Moving companies such as Pickfords offered private services in the same way.

=== Containerization ===
In 1933 in Europe, under the auspices of the International Chamber of Commerce, The Bureau International des Containers et du Transport Intermodal (BIC; English: International Bureau for Containers and Intermodal Transport) was established. In June 1933, the BIC decided about obligatory parameters for container use in international traffic. Containers handled by means of lifting gear, such as cranes, overhead conveyors, etc. for traveling elevators (group I containers), constructed after July 1, 1933. Obligatory Regulations:

- Clause 1 — Containers are, as regards form, either of the closed or the open type, and, as regards capacity, either of the heavy or the light type.
- Clause 2 — The loading capacity of containers must be such that their total weight (load, plus tare) is: 5 tonnes (4.92 long tons; 5.51 short tons) for containers of the heavy type; 2.5 tonnes (2.46 long tons; 2.76 short tons) for containers of the light type; a tolerance of 5 percent excess on the total weight is allowable under the same conditions as for wagon loads.

Obligatory norms for European containers since 1 July 1933
Category	Length [m (ft in)	[m (ft in)]	[m (ft in)]	Total mass [tons]
Heavy types
Close type 62	3.25 m (10 ft 8 in)	2.15 m (7 ft 5/8 in)	2.20 m (7 ft 2 5/8 in)	5 t (4.92 long tons; 5.51 short tons)
Close type 42	2.15 m (7 ft 5/8 in)	2.15 m (7 ft 5/8 in)	2.20 m (7 ft 2 5/8 in)	5 t (4.92 long tons; 5.51 short tons)
Open type 61	3.25 m (10 ft 8 in)	2.15 m (7 ft 5/8 in)	1.10 m (3 ft 7 1/4 in)	5 t (4.92 long tons; 5.51 short tons)
Open type 41	2.15 m (7 ft 5/8 in)	2.15 m (7 ft 5/8 in)	1.10 m (3 ft 7 1/4 in)	5 t (4.92 long tons; 5.51 short tons)
Light Type
Close type 22	2.15 m (7 ft 5/8 in)	1.05 m (3 ft 5 3/8 in)	2.20 m (7 ft 2 5/8 in)	2.5 t (2.46 long tons; 2.76 short tons)
Close type 201	2.15 m (7 ft 5/8 in)	1.05 m (3 ft 5 3/8 in)	1.10 m (3 ft 7 1/4 in)	2.5 t (2.46 long tons; 2.76 short tons)
Open type 21	2.15 m (7 ft 5/8 in)	1.05 m (3 ft 5 3/8 in)	1.10 m (3 ft 7 1/4 in)	2.5 t (2.46 long tons; 2.76 short tons)

In April 1935, BIC established a second standard for European containers:

Obligatory norms for European containers since 1 April 1935
Category	Length [m (ftin)]	Width [m (ftin)]	High [m (ftin)]	Total mass [tons]
Heavy types
Close 62	3.25 m (10 ft 8 in)	2.15 m (7 ft 5/8 in)	2.55 m (8 ft 4 3/8 in)	5 t (4.92 long tons; 5.51 short tons)
Close 42	2.15 m (7 ft 5/8 in)	2.15 m (7 ft 5/8 in)	2.55 m (8 ft 4 3/8 in)	5 t (4.92 long tons; 5.51 short tons)
Open 61	3.25 m (10 ft 8 in)	2.15 m (7 ft 5/8 in)	1.125 m (3 ft 8 5/16 in)	5 t (4.92 long tons; 5.51 short tons)
Open 41	2.15 m (7 ft 5/8 in)	2.15 m (7 ft 5/8 in)	1.125 m (3 ft 8 5/16 in)	5 t (4.92 long tons; 5.51 short tons)
Light Type
Close 32	1.50 m (4 ft 11 in)	2.15 m (7 ft 5/8 in)	2.55 m (8 ft 4 3/8 in)	2.5 t (2.46 long tons; 2.76 short tons)
Close 22	1.05 m (3 ft 5 3/8 in)	2.15 m (7 ft 5/8 in)	2.55 m (8 ft 4 3/8 in)	2.5 t (2.46 long tons; 2.76 short tons)

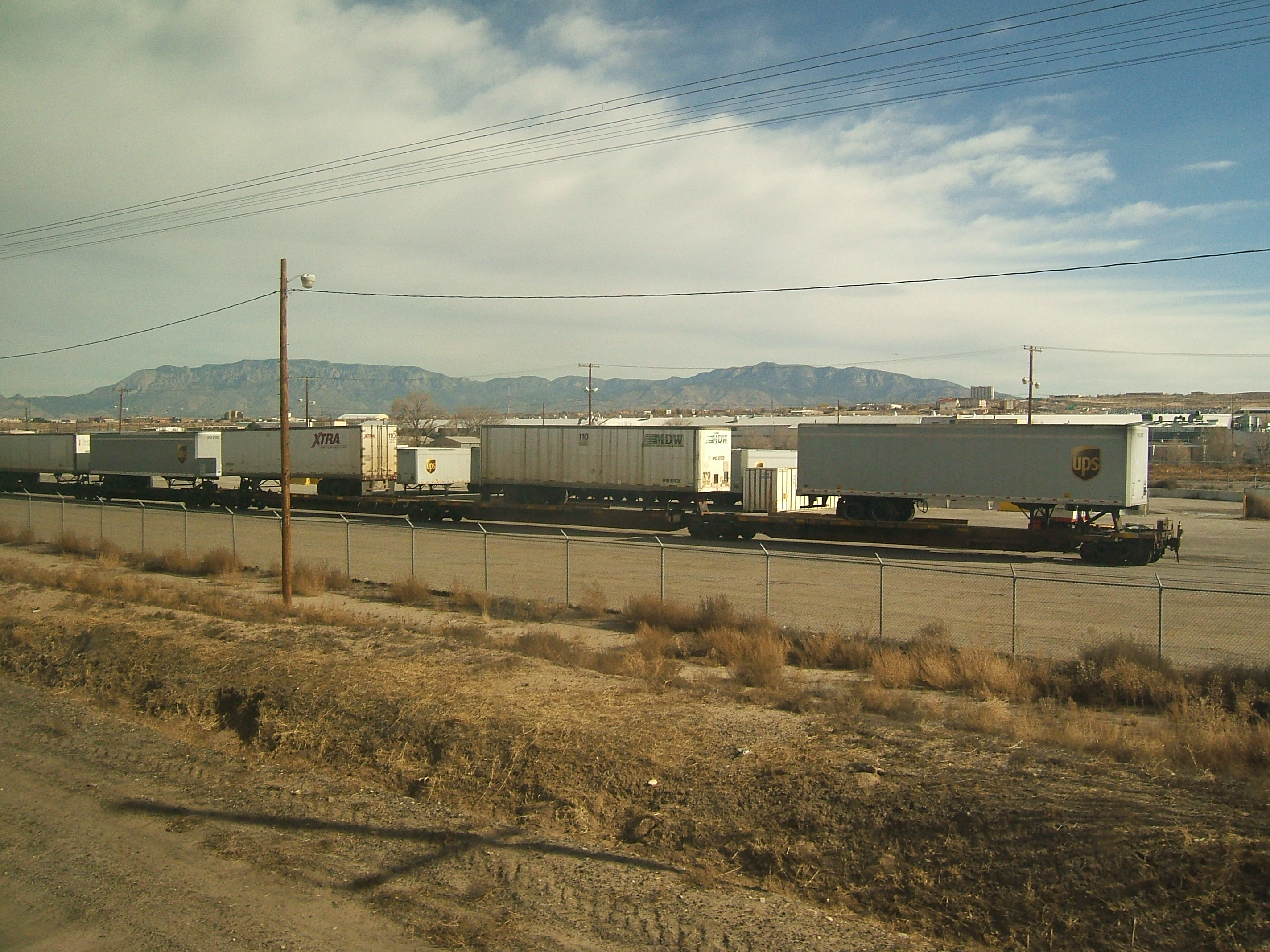
Highway semi-trailers in piggyback service in Albuquerque, New Mexico

In the 1950s, a new standardized steel Intermodal container based on specifications from the United States Department of Defense began to revolutionize freight transportation. The International Organization for Standardization (ISO) then issued standards based upon the U.S. Department of Defense standards between 1968 and 1970.

The White Pass & Yukon Route railway acquired the world's first container ship, the Clifford J. Rogers, built in 1955, and introduced containers to its railway in 1956. In the United Kingdom the modernisation plan, and in turn the Beeching Report, strongly pushed containerization. British Railways launched the Freightliner service carrying 8-foot (2.4 m) high pre-ISO containers. The older wooden containers and the pre-ISO containers were rapidly replaced by 10-and-20-foot (3.0 and 6.1 m) ISO standard containers, and later by 40-foot (12 m) containers and larger.

In the U.S., starting in the 1960s, the use of containers increased steadily. Rail intermodal traffic tripled between 1980 and 2002, according to the Association of American Railroads (AAR), from 3.1 million trailers and containers to 9.3 million. Large investments were made in intermodal freight projects. An example was the US$740 million Port of Oakland intermodal rail facility begun in the late 1980s.

Since 1984, a mechanism for intermodal shipping known as double-stack rail transport has become increasingly common. Rising to the rate of nearly 70% of the United States' intermodal shipments, it transports more than one million containers per year. The double-stack rail cars design significantly reduces damage in transit and provides greater cargo security by cradling the lower containers so their doors cannot be opened. A succession of large, new, domestic container sizes was introduced to increase shipping productivity. In Europe, the more restricted loading gauge has limited the adoption of double-stack cars. However, in 2007 the Betuweroute, a railway from Rotterdam to the German industrial heartland, was completed, which may accommodate double-stacked containers in the future. Other countries, like New Zealand, have numerous low tunnels and bridges that limit expansion for economic reasons.

Since electrification generally predated double-stacking, the overhead wiring was too low to accommodate it. However, India is building some freight-only corridors with the overhead wiring at 7.45 m above rail, which is high enough.

=== Containers and container handling ===
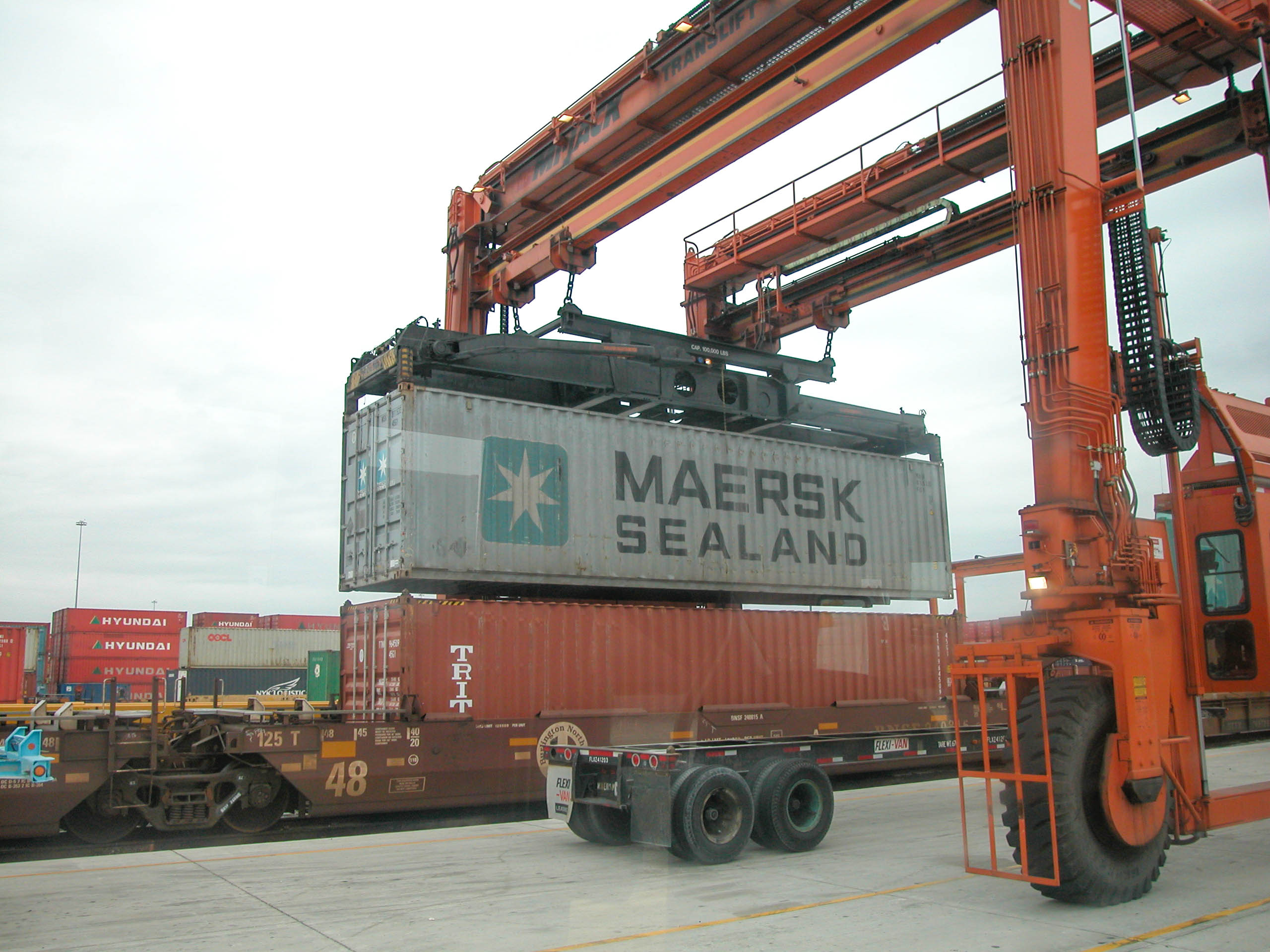
Rubber tired gantry crane double-stacking a 40 foot container

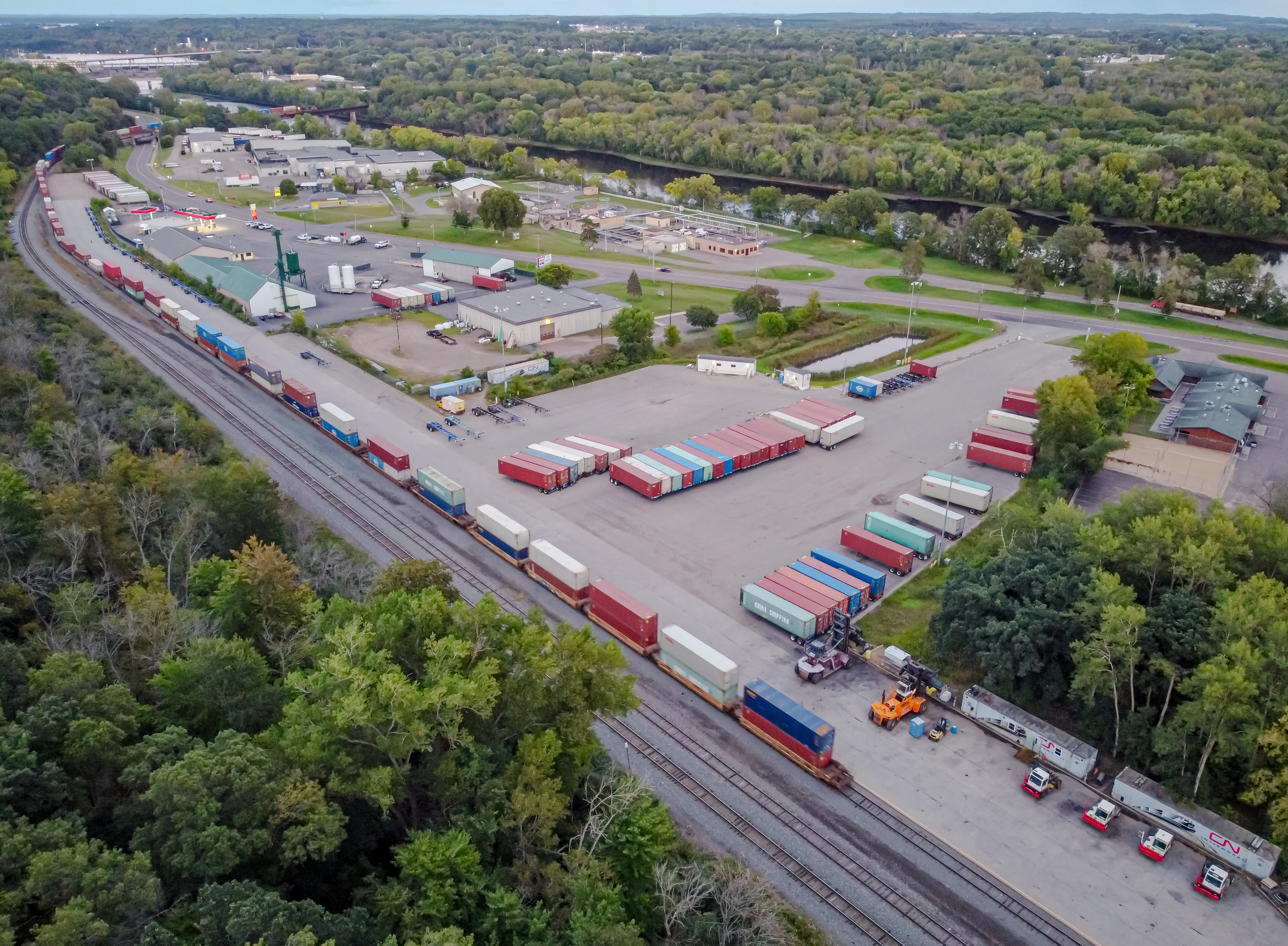
Small intermodal terminal in Chippewa Falls on the Canadian National line

Containers, also known as intermodal containers or ISO containers because the dimensions have been defined by ISO, are the main type of equipment used in intermodal transport, particularly when one of the modes of transportation is by ship. Containers are 8-foot (2.4 m) wide by 8-foot (2.4 m) or 9-foot-6-inch (2.90 m) high. Since introduction, there have been moves to adopt other heights, such as 10-foot-6-inch (3.20 m). The most common lengths are 20 feet (6.1 m), 40 feet (12 m), 45 feet (14 m), 48 and 53 feet (15 and 16 m), although other lengths exist. The three common sizes are:

- one TEU – 20-by-8-foot (6.1 m × 2.4 m) × 8-foot-6-inch (2.59 m)
- two TEU – 40-by-8-foot (12.2 m × 2.4 m) × 8-foot-6-inch (2.59 m)
- highcube−40-by-8-foot (−12.2 m × 2.4 m) × 9-foot-6-inch (2.90 m).

In countries where the railway loading gauge is sufficient, truck trailers are often carried by rail. Variations exist, including open-topped versions covered by a fabric curtain are used to transport larger loads. A container called a tanktainer, with a tank inside a standard container frame, carries liquids. Refrigerated containers (reefer) are used for perishables. Swap body units have the same bottom corners as intermodal containers but are not strong enough to be stacked. They have folding legs under their frame and can be moved between trucks without using a crane.

Handling equipment can be designed with intermodality in mind, assisting with transferring containers between rail, road and sea. These can include:

- container gantry crane for transferring containers from seagoing vessels onto either trucks or rail wagons. A spreader beam moves in several directions allowing accurate positioning of the cargo. A container crane is mounted on rails moving parallel to the ship's side, with a large boom spanning the distance between the ship's cargo hold and the quay.
- Straddle carriers, and the larger rubber tyred gantry crane are able to straddle container stacks as well as rail and road vehicles, allowing for quick transfer of containers.
- Grappler lift, which is very similar to a straddle carrier except it grips the bottom of a container rather than the top.
- Reach stackers are fitted with lifting arms as well as spreader beams for lifting containers to truck or rail and can stack containers on top of each other.
- Sidelifters are a road-going truck or semi-trailer with cranes fitted at each end to hoist and transport containers in small yards or over longer distances.
- Forklift trucks in larger sizes are often used to load containers to/from truck and rail.
- Flatbed trucks with special chain assemblies such as QuickLoadz can pull containers onto or off of the bed using the corner castings.

=== Load securing in intermodal containers ===
According to the European Commission Transportation Department "it has been estimated that up to 25% of accidents involving trucks can be attributable to inadequate cargo securing". Cargo that is improperly secured can cause severe accidents and lead to the loss of cargo, the loss of lives, the loss of vehicles, ships and airplane; not to mention the environmental hazards it can cause. There are many different ways and materials available to stabilize and secure cargo in containers used in the various modes of transportation. Conventional Load Securing methods and materials such as steel banding and wood blocking & bracing have been around for decades and are still widely used. In the last few years the use of several, relatively new and unknown Load Securing methods have become available through innovation and technological advancement including polyester strapping and -lashing, synthetic webbings and Dunnage Bags, also known as air bags.

Load securing in intermodal containers

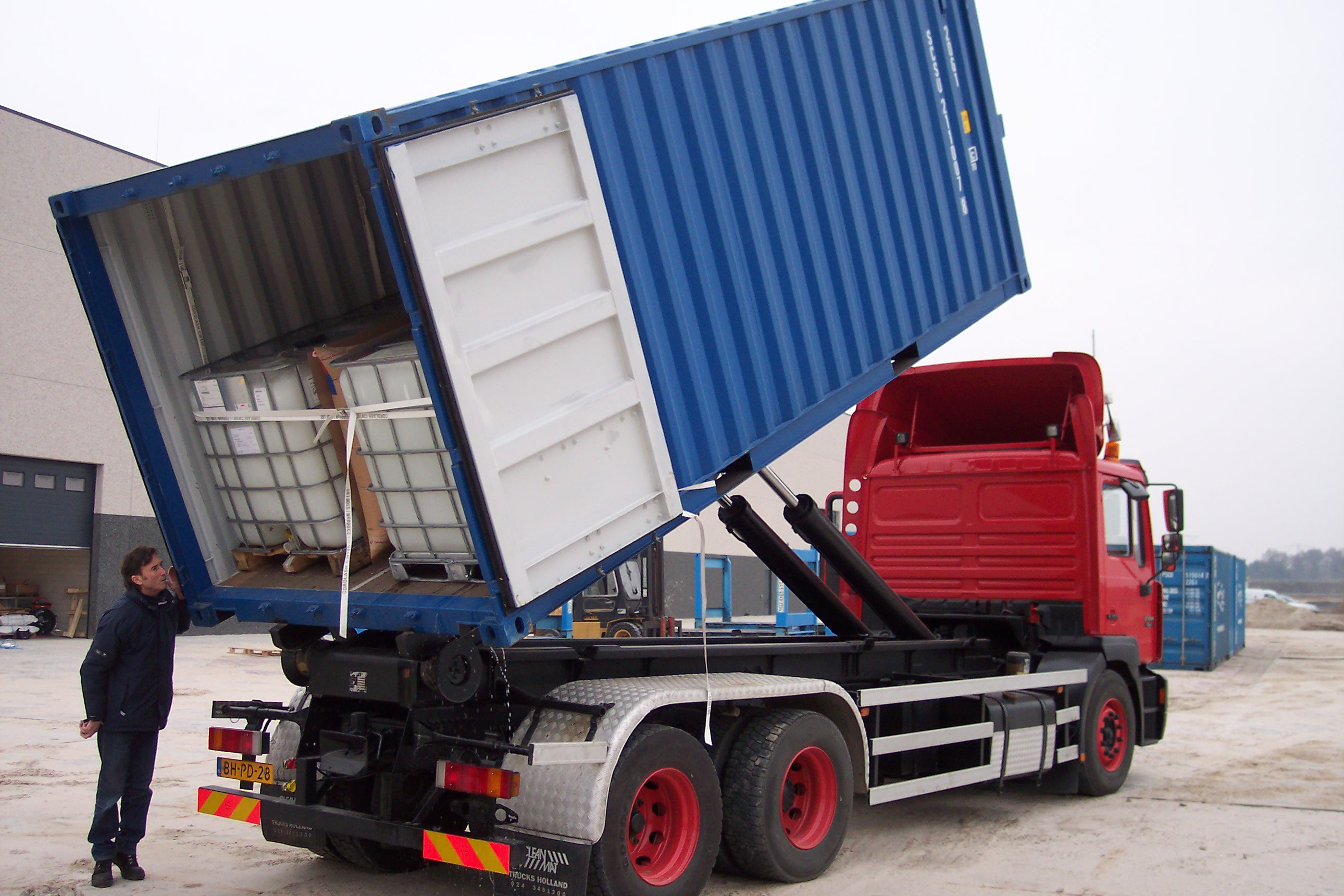
Application in container

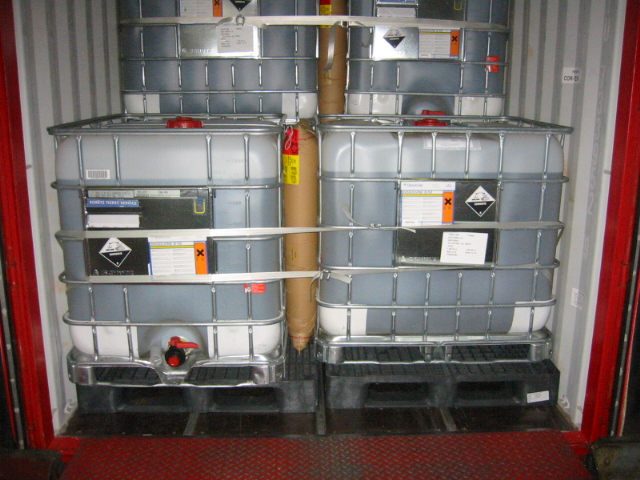
Polyester strapping and dunnage bag application

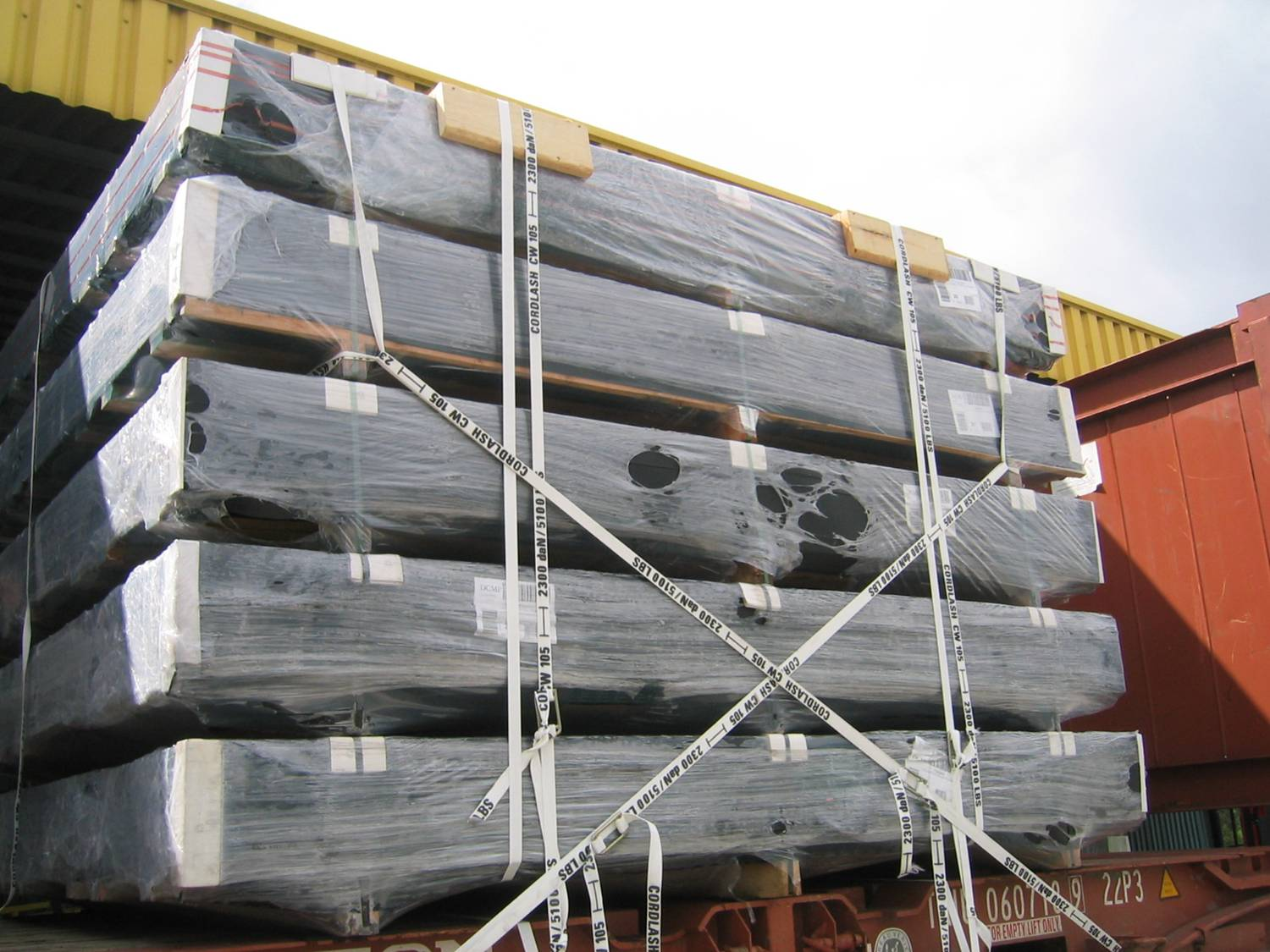
Polyester lashing application

== Transportation modes ==
=== Container ships ===
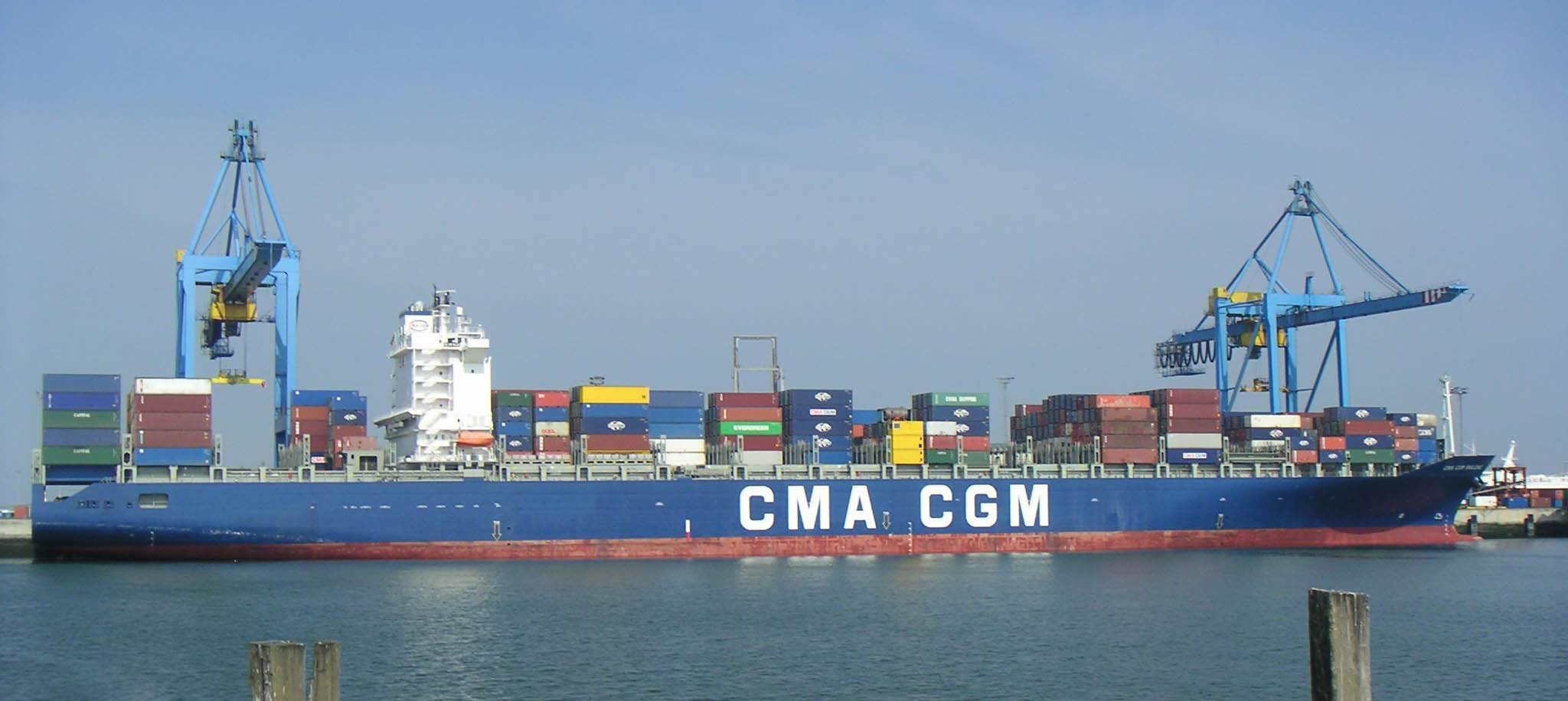
The 300-meter (984-foot) long container ship Balzac in Zeebrugge port in Belgium

Container ships are used to transport containers by sea. These vessels are custom-built to hold containers. Some vessels can hold thousands of containers. Their capacity is often measured in TEU or FEU. These initials stand for "twenty-foot equivalent unit", and "forty-foot equivalent unit", respectively. For example, a vessel that can hold 1,000 40-foot containers or 2,000 20-foot containers can be said to have a capacity of 2,000 TEU. After the year 2006, the largest container ships in regular operation are capable of carrying in excess of 15,000 TEU.

On board ships they are typically stacked up to seven units high.

A key consideration in the size of container ships is that larger ships exceed the capacity of important sea routes such as the Panama and Suez canals. The largest size of container ship able to traverse the Panama canal is referred to as Panamax, which is presently around 5,000 TEU. A third set of locks is planned as part of the Panama Canal expansion project to accommodate container ships up to 12,000 TEU in future, comparable to the present Suezmax.

Very large container ships also require specialized deep water terminals and handling facilities. The container fleet available, route constraints, and terminal capacity play a large role in shaping global container shipment logistics.

=== Railways and intermodal terminals ===
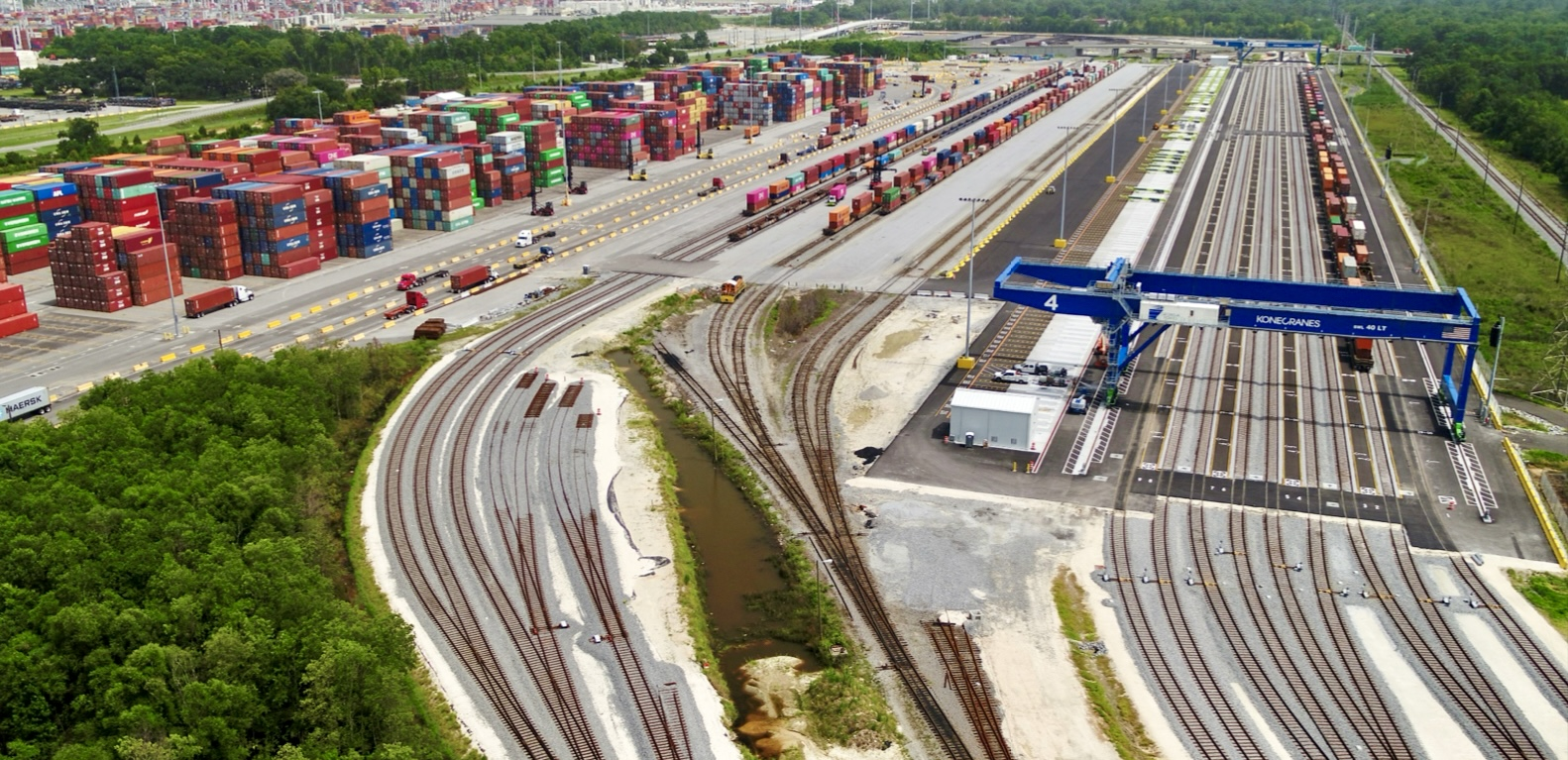
Georgia Ports Authority intermodal terminal at the Port of Savannah

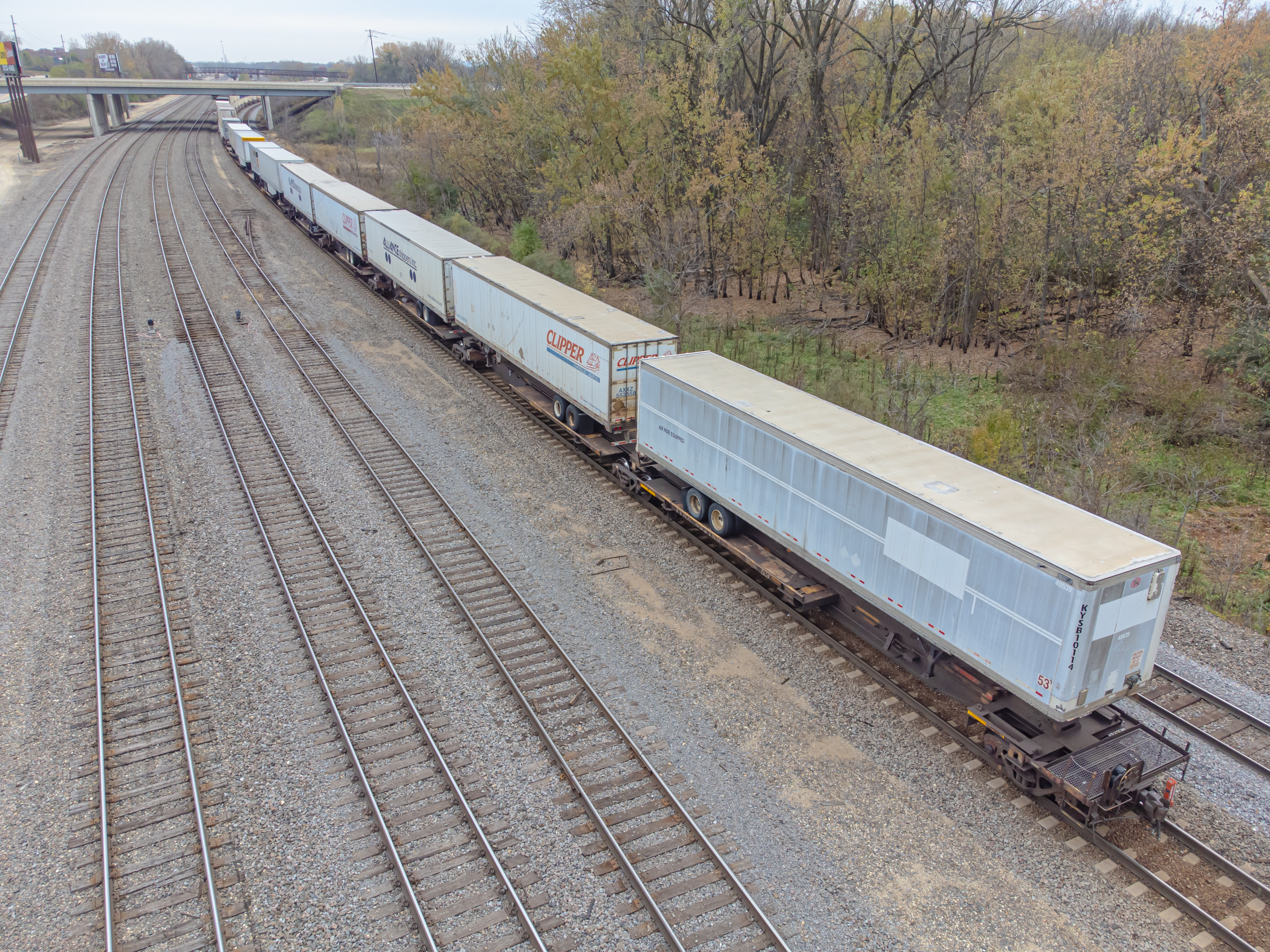
Spine cars with semi trailers on them

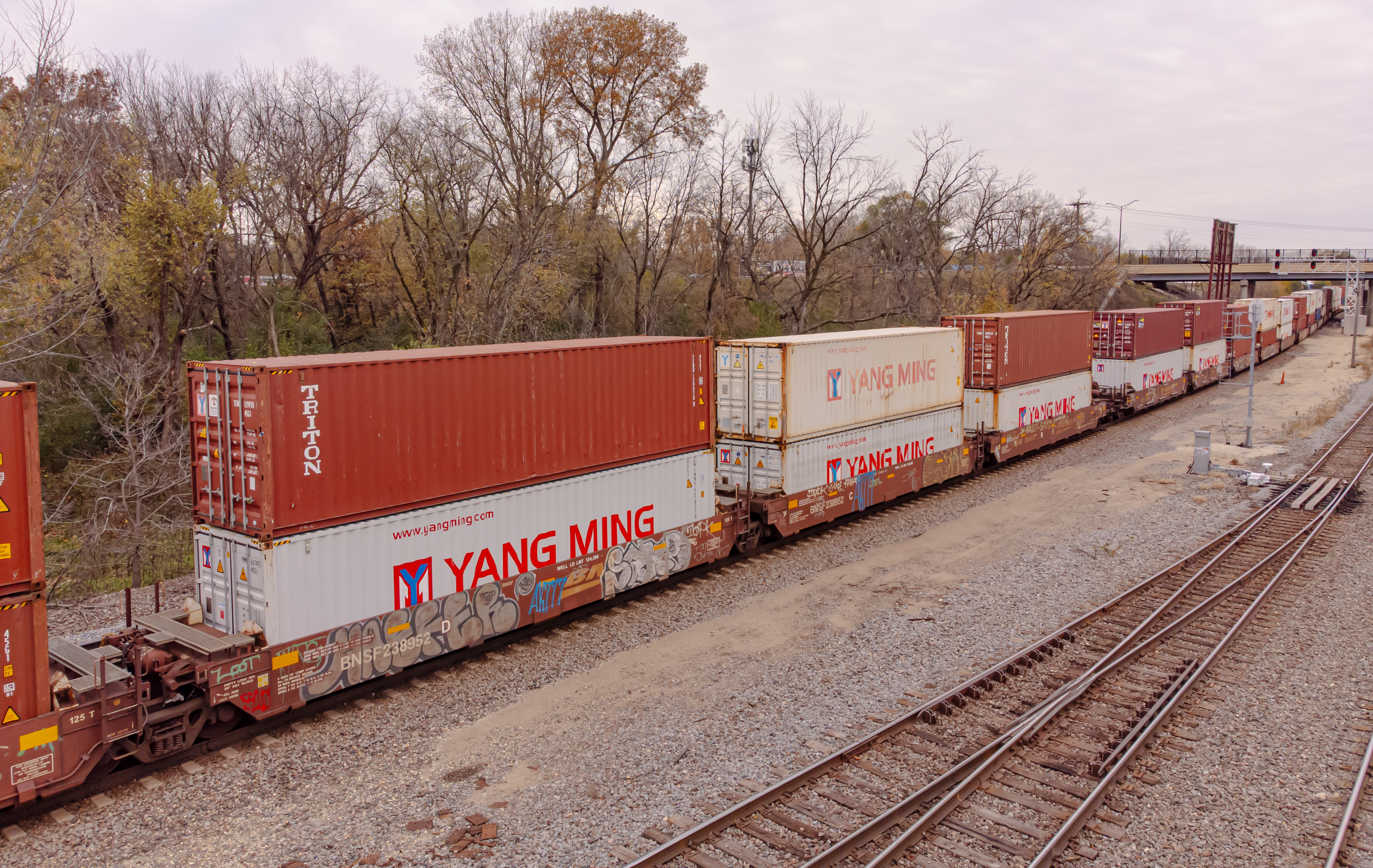
40 foot containers in well cars on the BNSF line through La Crosse

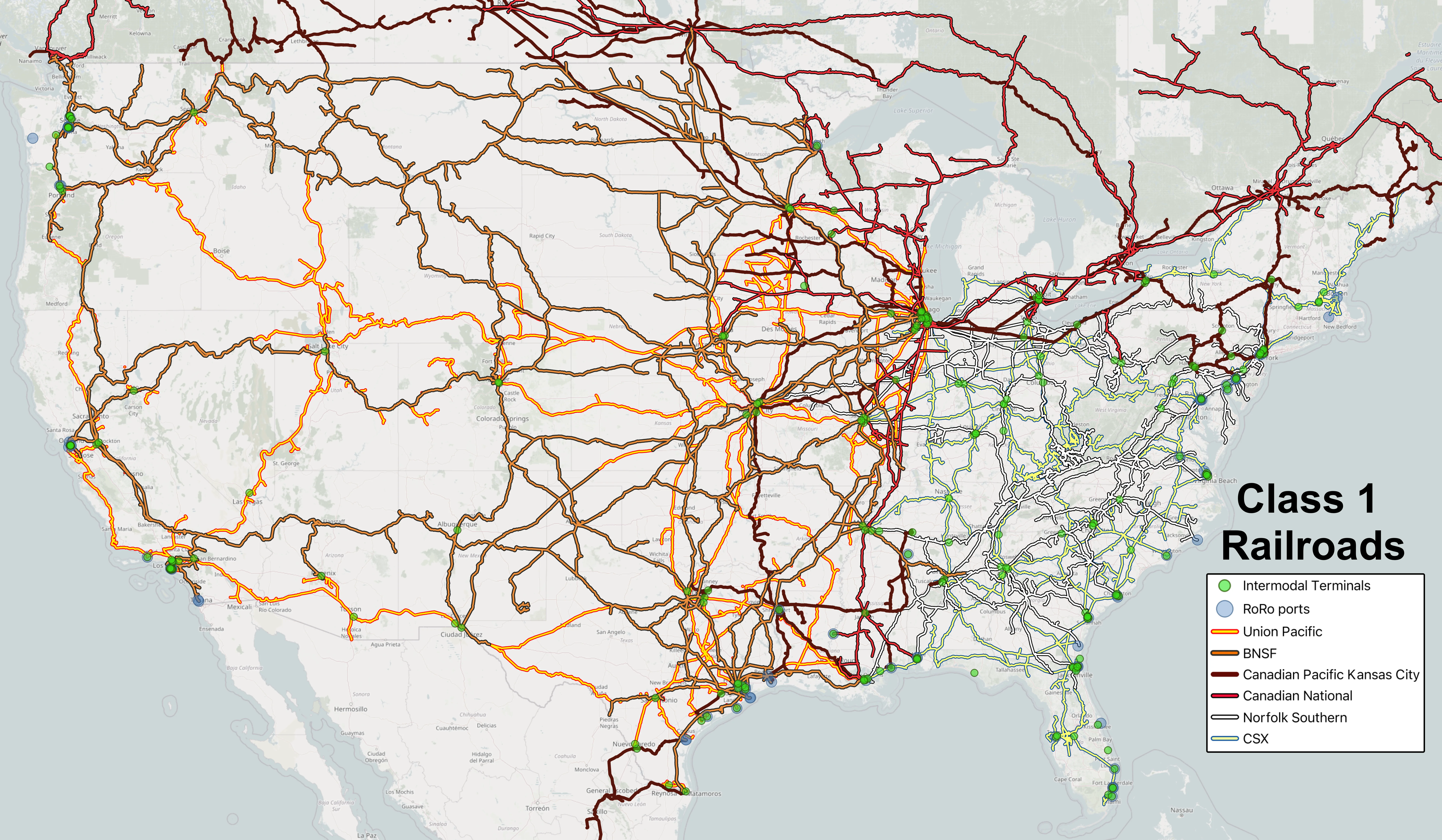
Class 1 railroads with intermodal terminals and maritime RoRo ports

Increasingly, containers are shipped by rail in container well cars. These cars resemble flatcars but have a container-sized depression, or well, in the middle of the car between the bogies or trucks. Some container cars are built as an articulated "unit" of three or five permanently coupled cars, each having a single bogie rather than the two bogies normally found on freight cars.

Containers can be loaded on flatcars or in container well cars. In North America, Australia and Saudi Arabia, where vertical clearances are generally liberal, this depression is sufficient for two containers to be loaded in a "double-stack" arrangement. In Europe, height restrictions imposed by smaller structure gauges, and frequent overhead electrification, prevent double-stacking. Containers are therefore hauled one-high, either on standard flatcars or other railroad cars – but they must be carried in well wagons on lines built early in the Industrial Revolution, such as in the United Kingdom, where loading gauges are relatively small. In India (which uses Indian broad gauge) and China double-stack container trains run on electrified rail lines purpose-built or upgraded to the needed standards. There are plans to electrify the Mombasa–Nairobi Standard Gauge Railway which has been transporting double-stacked containers with diesel locomotives since 2018.

610 mm (2 ft) narrow-gauge railways have smaller wagons that do not readily carry ISO containers, nor do the 30-foot (9.14 m) long and 7-foot (2.13 m) wide wagons of the 762 mm (2 ft 6 in) gauge Kalka-Shimla Railway. Wider narrow gauge railways of e.g. 914 mm (3 ft) and 1,000 mm (3 ft 3 3/8 in) gauge can take ISO containers, provided that the loading gauge allows it.

It is also common in North America and Australia to transport semi-trailers on railway flatcars or spine cars, an arrangement called "piggyback" or TOFC (trailer on flatcar) to distinguish it from container on flatcar (COFC). Some flatcars are designed with collapsible trailer hitches so they can be used for trailer or container service. Such designs allow trailers to be rolled on from one end, though lifting trailers on and off flatcars by specialized loaders is more common. TOFC terminals typically have large areas for storing trailers pending loading or pickup.

Thievery has become a problem in North America. Sophisticated thieves learn how to interpret the codes on the outside of containers to ascertain which ones have easily disposable cargo. They break into isolated containers on long trains, or even board slowly moving trains to toss the items to accomplices on the ground.

=== Trucks ===
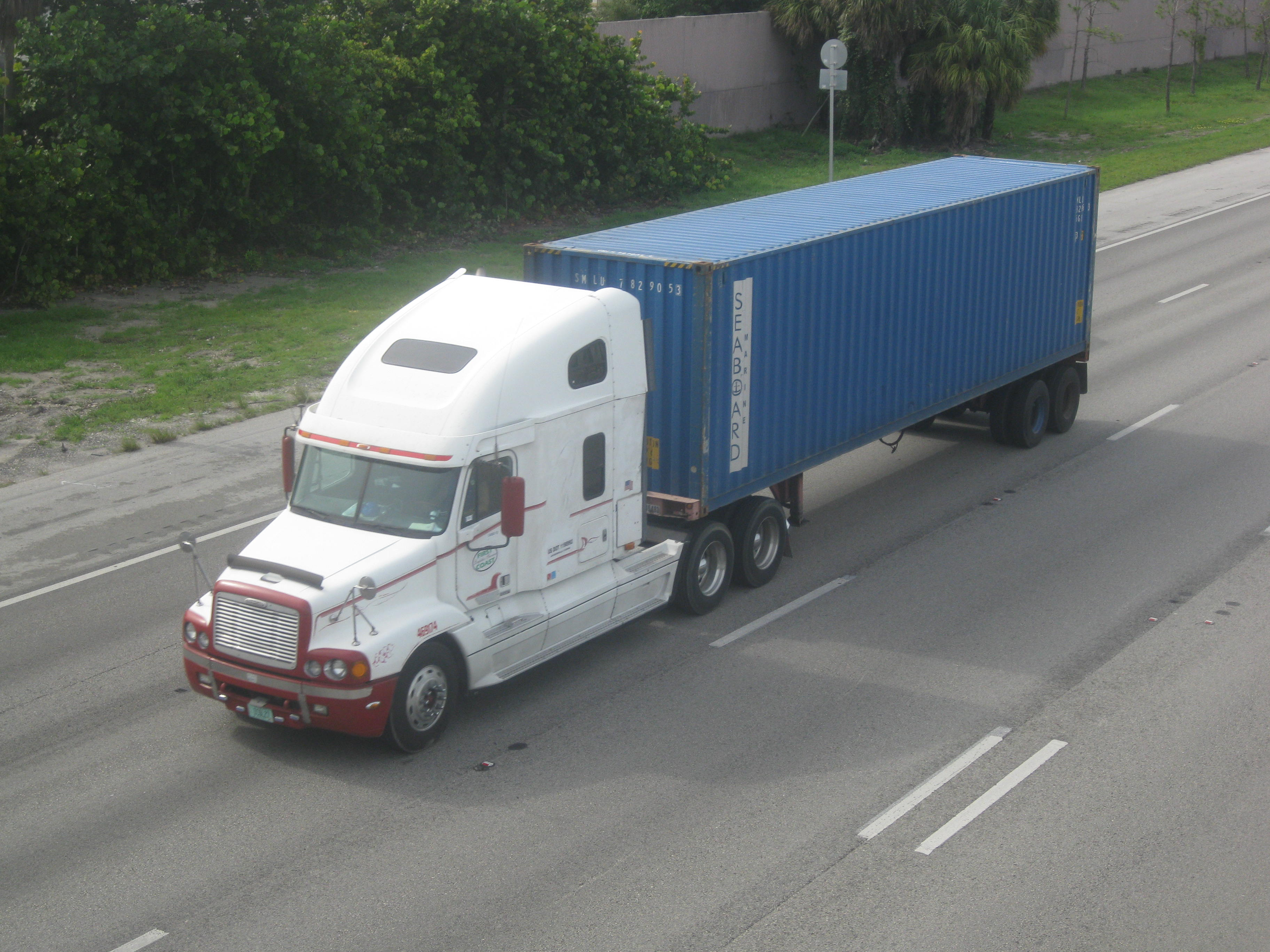
A truck transporting a container on Interstate 95 in South Florida

Trucking is frequently used to connect the "linehaul" ocean and rail segments of a global intermodal freight movement. This specialized trucking that runs between ocean ports, rail terminals, and inland shipping docks, is often called drayage, and is typically provided by dedicated drayage companies or by the railroads. As an example, since many rail lines in the United States terminate in or around Chicago, Illinois, the area serves as a common relay point for containerized freight moving across the country. Many of the motor carriers call this type of drayage "crosstown loads" that originate at one rail road and terminate at another. For example, a container destined for the east coast from the west will arrive in Chicago either via the Union Pacific or BNSF Railway and have to be relayed to one of the eastern railroads, either CSX or Norfolk Southern.

=== Barges ===
Barge transportation provides a sustainable and cost-effective alternative to road transport, offering solutions to reduce congestion and lower emissions. However, increasing drought frequency and severity, driven by climate change, along with human interventions such as dam operations, dredging, and water withdrawals, cause fluctuations in water levels in rivers and canals that jeopardize its reliability and efficiency. These variations, including shallow water conditions, reduced water levels, and restricted navigable depths, directly impact barge operations by limiting transportation capacity. A barge's load capacity depends not only on its physical characteristics but also on the available water level along its route. Insufficient or diminished water levels impose draught restrictions that constrain freight volume and weight, creating operational challenges that hinder carriers’ ability to meet shipper demands efficiently and maintain profitability. Barges utilising ro-ro and container-stacking techniques transport freight on large inland waterways such as the Rhine/Danube in Europe and the Mississippi River in the U.S.

Over the last decade, intermodal barge transport has been successful in gaining market share in Northwest Europe. The barge sector has been able to cater to the ever-increasing demands of shippers. It is now a leading mode of transport along the major river corridors and contributed to opening new geographical markets. These developments are due to the cost-quality features of intermodal barge transport compared to its main competitor, unimodal road transport.

=== Land bridges ===
The term landbridge or land bridge is commonly used in the intermodal freight transport sector. When a containerized ocean freight shipment travels across a large body of land for a significant distance, that portion of the trip is referred to as the "land bridge" and the mode of transport used is rail transport. There are three applications for the term.

- Land bridge – An intermodal container shipped by ocean vessel crosses an entire body of land/country/continent before being reloaded on a cargo ship. For example, a container shipment from China to Germany is loaded onto a ship in China, unloads at a Los Angeles port, travels via rail transport to a New York/New Jersey port, and loads on a ship for Hamburg. Also see Eurasian Land Bridge.
- Mini land bridge – An intermodal container shipped by ocean vessel from country A to country B passes across a large portion of land in either country A or B. For example, a container shipment from China to New York is loaded onto a ship in China, unloads at a Los Angeles port and travels via rail transport to New York, the final destination.
- Micro land bridge – An intermodal container shipped by ocean vessel from country A to country B passes across a large portion of land to reach an interior inland destination. For example, a container shipment from China to Denver, Colorado, is loaded onto a ship in China, unloads at a Los Angeles port and travels via rail transport to Denver, the final destination.

The term reverse land bridge refers to a micro land bridge from an east coast port (as opposed to a west coast port in the previous examples) to an inland destination.

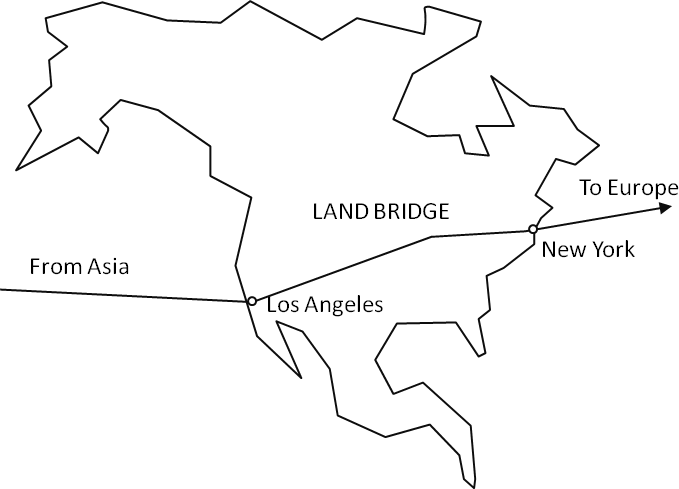
Image of a land bridge.

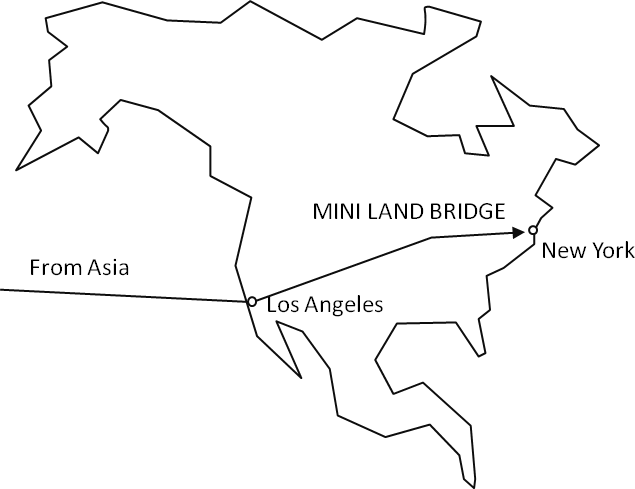
Image of a mini land bridge.

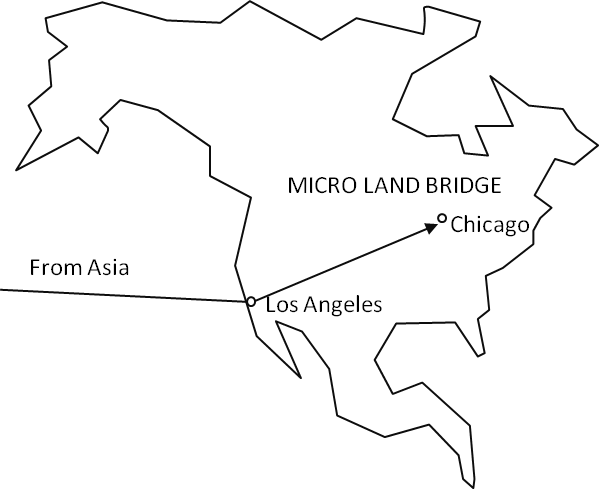
Image of a micro land bridge.

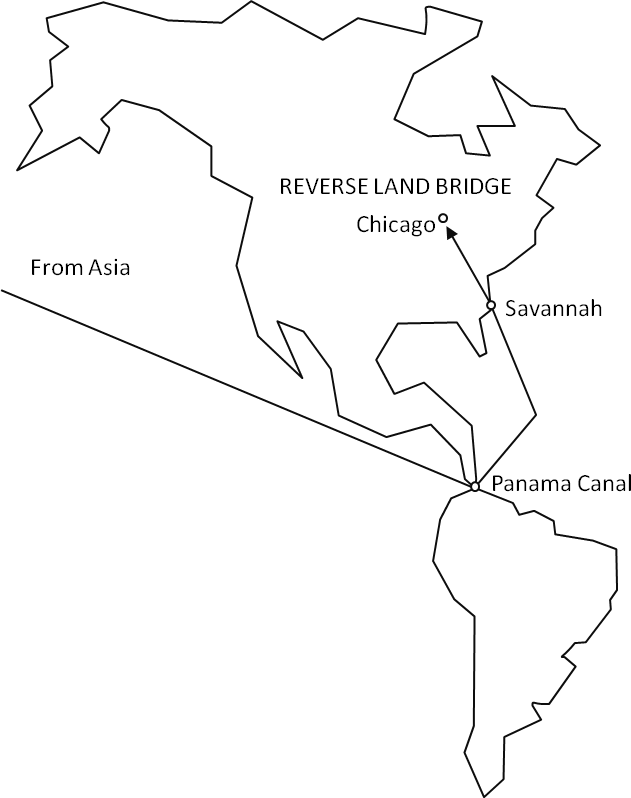
Image of a reverse land bridge.

=== Planes and aircraft ===
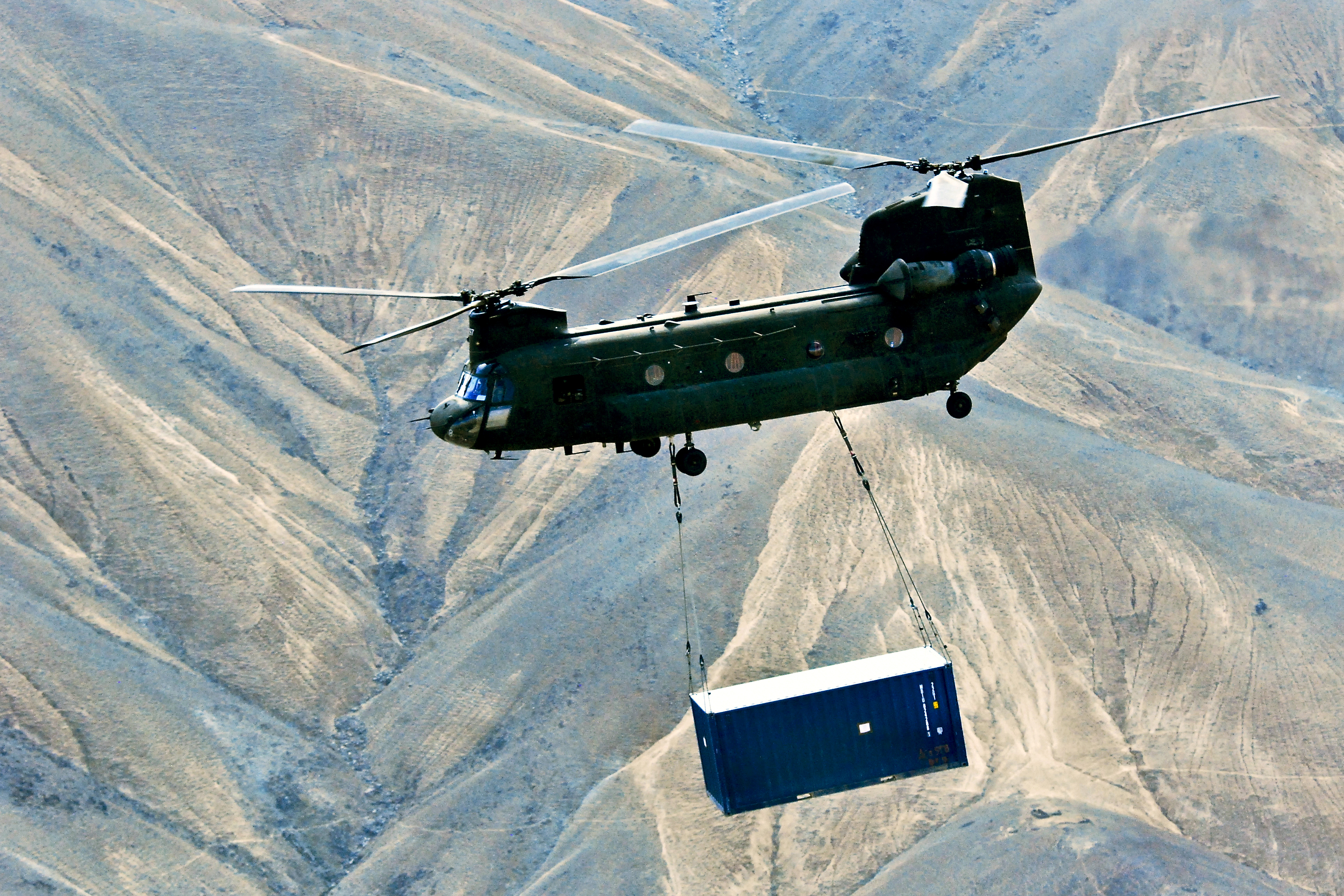
A U.S. Army CH-47 Chinook helicopter carries a sling-loaded 20 foot shipping container during retrograde operations and base closures in the Wardak province of Afghanistan

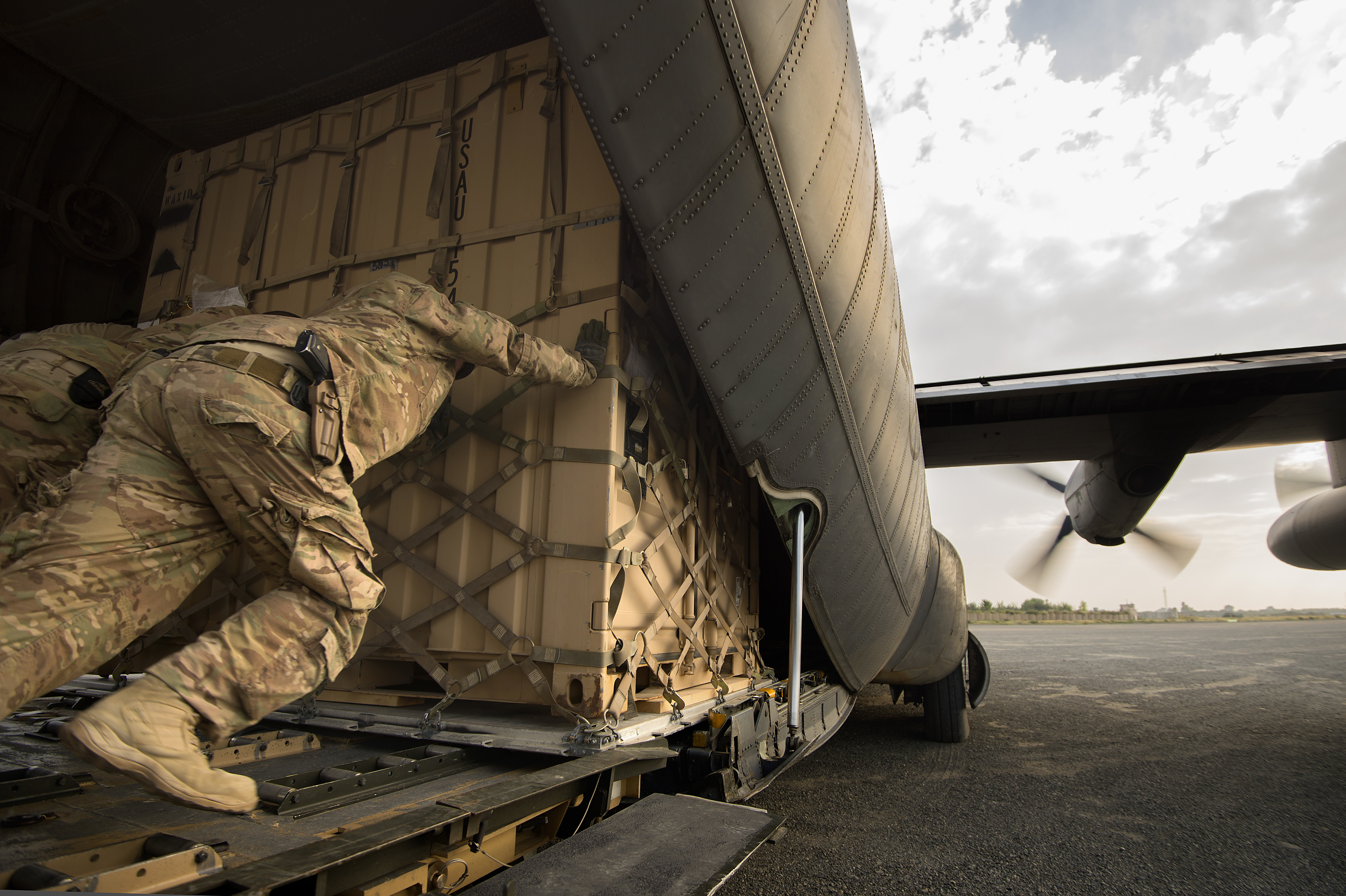
Tri-con being loaded onto a C-130 in Afghanistan

Air freight transport connects distant markets and global supply chains in a fast and reliable way. High value and perishable goods are transported all over the world, hence, improving air connectivity represents a key element to sustainable economic growth. In intermodal supply chains, air freight transport is one of the vital parts, and better inclusion is justified and encouraged. For example, in 2025, Cainiao, Alibaba's logistics arm, reached a long-term strategic partnership with Qatar Airways Cargo, which was expected to more than double weekly freight flights on core China-Europe routes. The partnership aimed to increase capacity, improve schedule reliability and provide more flexible shipping options for e-commerce platforms such as AliExpress. Air freight transport is analyzed by amount and value transported in the European Union and the world, as well as its share in global freight transport. Intermodal technologies in all transport modes are described and analyzed, with a special overview of air freight intermodal technologies.

Air freight transport contributes significantly to the world economy and is a key indicator of its efficiency, as goods transported by air, despite a modest 0.5% volume share of transported goods in the world, reaches 35% of total freight traffic in value carried by air transport, representing about $6.5 trillion annually and provides 87.7 million jobs worldwide according to ABBB (2021).

== Biggest shipping liner companies by TEU capacity ==
Top 20 container shipping companies in order of TEU capacity, 6 January 2016
Company	TEU capacity	Number of ships
A.P. Moller-Maersk Group	2,996,188	585
Mediterranean Shipping Company	2,678,779	496
CMA CGM	1,819,351	460
Evergreen Marine Corporation	931,849	195
Hapag-Lloyd	930,398	174
COSCO	870,222	162
CSCL	684,640	134
Hamburg Süd	645,889	136
Hanjin Shipping	626,217	104
OOCL	561,522	104
MOL	554,425	98
Yang Ming Marine Transport Corporation	538,912	102
APL	535,007	86
UASC	512,785	57
NYK Line	495,723	104
K Line	386,265	66
Hyundai Merchant Marine	379,392	57
Pacific International Lines	362,131	147
Zim	358,264	82
Wan Hai Lines	215,244	85

== Gallery ==
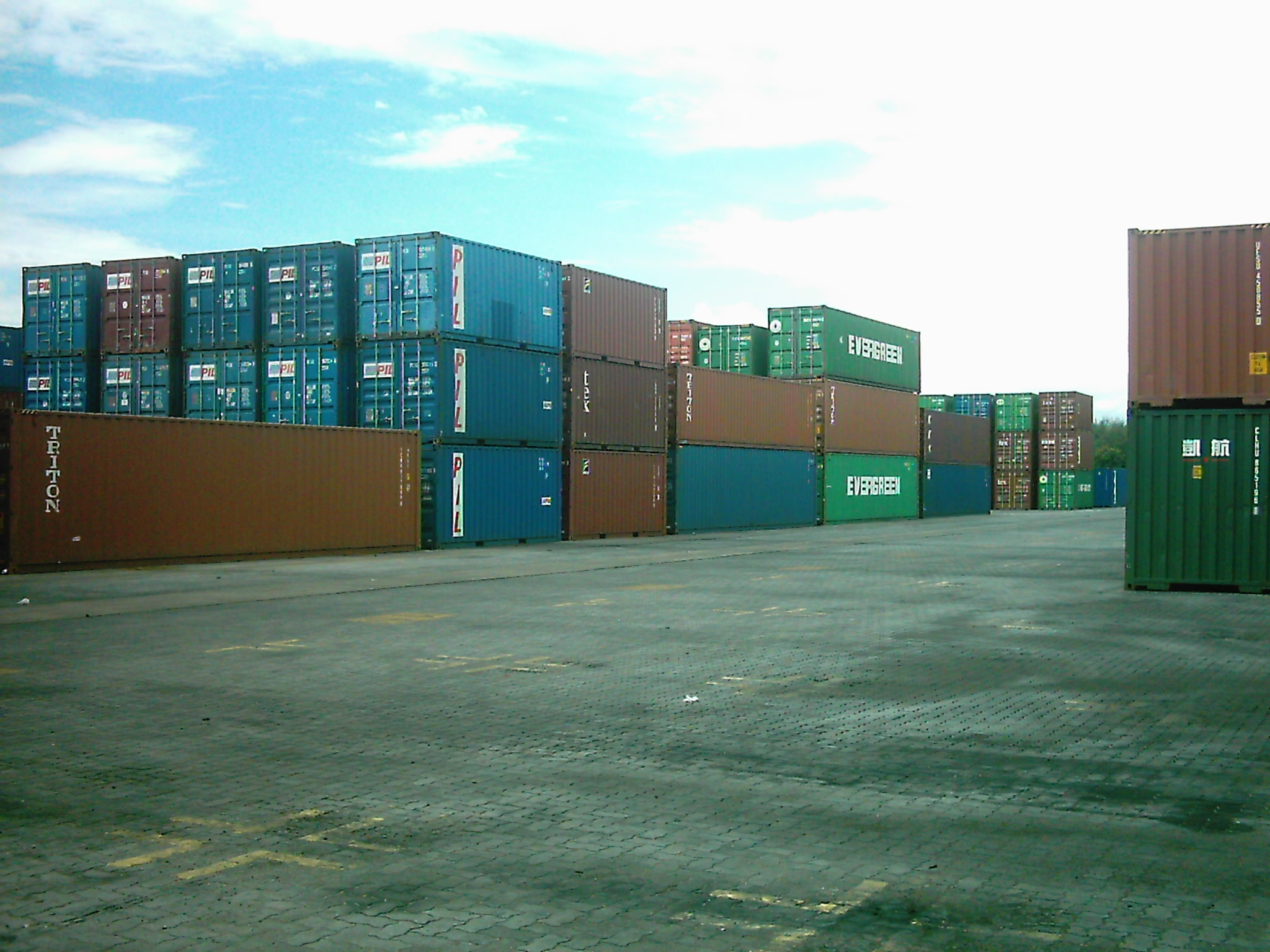
Containers at Kuantan Port

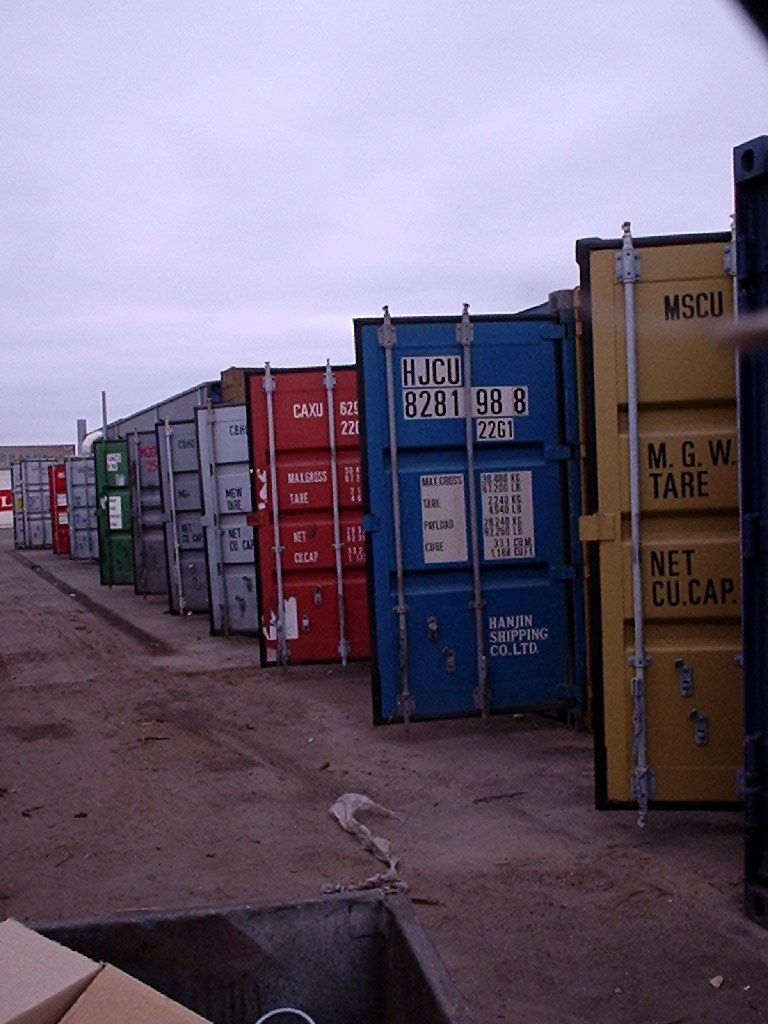
ISO-code and dimension/load table on several newly washed containers

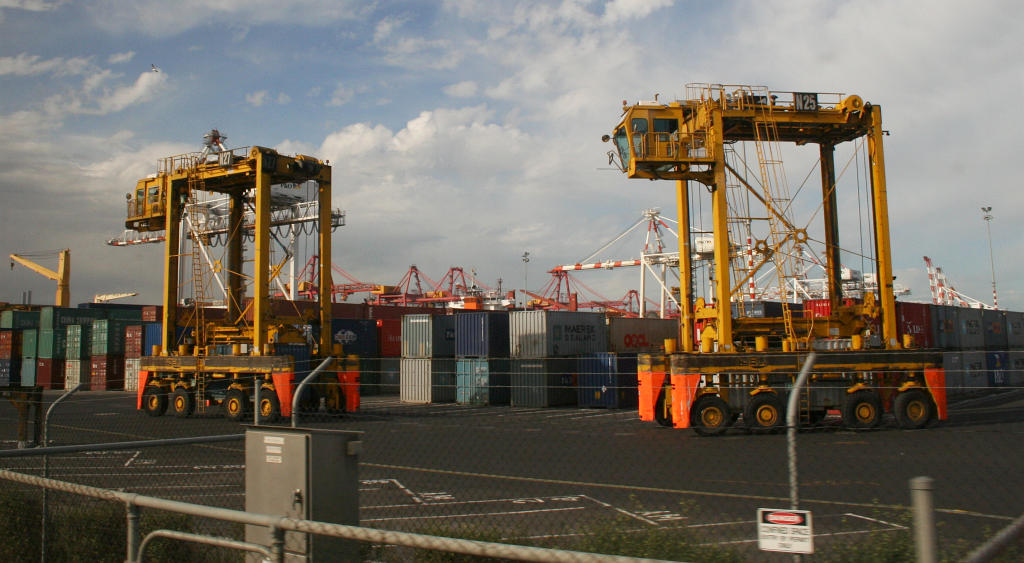
Straddle carriers in operation at the Port of Melbourne, Australia

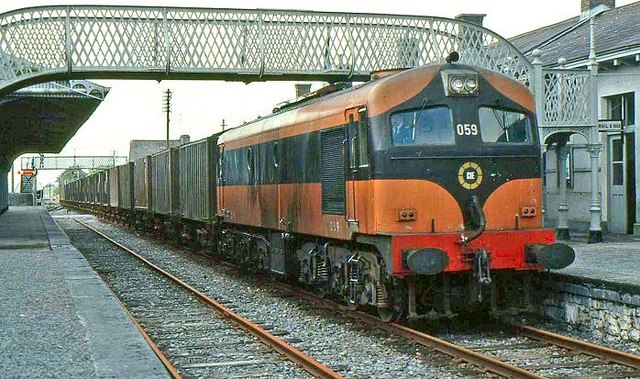
The former Asahi liner train running through Tuam railway station

== See also ==
- Combined transport
- Co-modality (by the European Commission)
- Container numbering
- Containerization
- CargoBeamer
- Customs Convention on Containers
- Dunnage bag
- Double-stack car
- Dry port
- Haulage
- Inland port
- Intermodal container
- Intermodal flatcars
- Konkan Railway Corporation
- Less-than-truckload (LTL) shipping
- Load securing
- Merchant ship
- Modalohr
- Piggy-back
- Roadrailer
- Rolling highway
- Shipping
- Sidelifter
- Swap body
- Tanktainer
- Transloading
- Top intermodal container companies list
- Well car

== Bibliography ==
- DeBoer, David J. (1992). Piggyback and Containers: A History of Rail Intermodal on America's Steel Highway. San Marino, California, US: Golden West Books. ISBN 0870951084.
- European Intermodal Association (2005). Intermodal Transport in Europe. EIA, Brussels. ISBN 90-901991-3-6
- McKenzie, David R.; North, Mark C.; Smith, Daniel S. (1989). Intermodal Transportation: The Whole Story. Omaha, Nebraska, US: Simmons-Boardman. ISBN 0911382097.
- Sidney, Samuel (1846). Gauge Evidence: The History and Prospects of the Railway System, Illustrated by the Evidence Given Before the Gauge Commission. Edmonds. hdl:2027/ien.35556037538931. OCLC 65281221.
- Solomon, Brian (2007). Intermodal Railroading. St. Paul, Minnesota, US: Voyageur Press. ISBN 9780760325285.
