= Bureau International des Containers =

- Abbreviation: BIC
- Established: 1933
- Type: Registration
- Legal status: Active
- Headquarters: Paris
- Parent organization: National Registration Organizations
- Affiliations: Customs Convention on Containers
- Website: www.bic-code.org

The Bureau International des Containers et du Transport Intermodal (originally French: Bureau International des Conteneurs, lit. 'International Container Bureau') (BIC) oversees standards for intermodal containers (commonly referred to as shipping containers).

The goal of the organization is to promote cooperation among corporations, governments and independent organizations relating to intermodal freight transport, the process of containerization, and the transport and handling of intermodal shipping containers.

== History ==
BIC was originally established in 1933 under the auspices of the International Chamber of Commerce. The Bureau suspended its operations during World War II, with resumption in 1948.

In June 1933, the Bureau decided on obligatory parameters for containers used in international transport in Europe. Containers handled by means of lifting gear, such as cranes, overhead conveyors, etc. for traveling elevators (group I containers), constructed after July 1, 1933. Obligatory Regulations:

- Clause 1.—Containers are, as regards form, either of the closed or the open type, and, as regards capacity, either of the heavy or the light type.
- Clause 2.—The loading capacity of containers must be such that their total weight (load, plus tare) is: 5 metric tons for containers of the heavy type; 2.5 metric tons for containers of the light type; a tolerance of 5 percent excess on the total weight is allowable under the same conditions as for wagon loads.

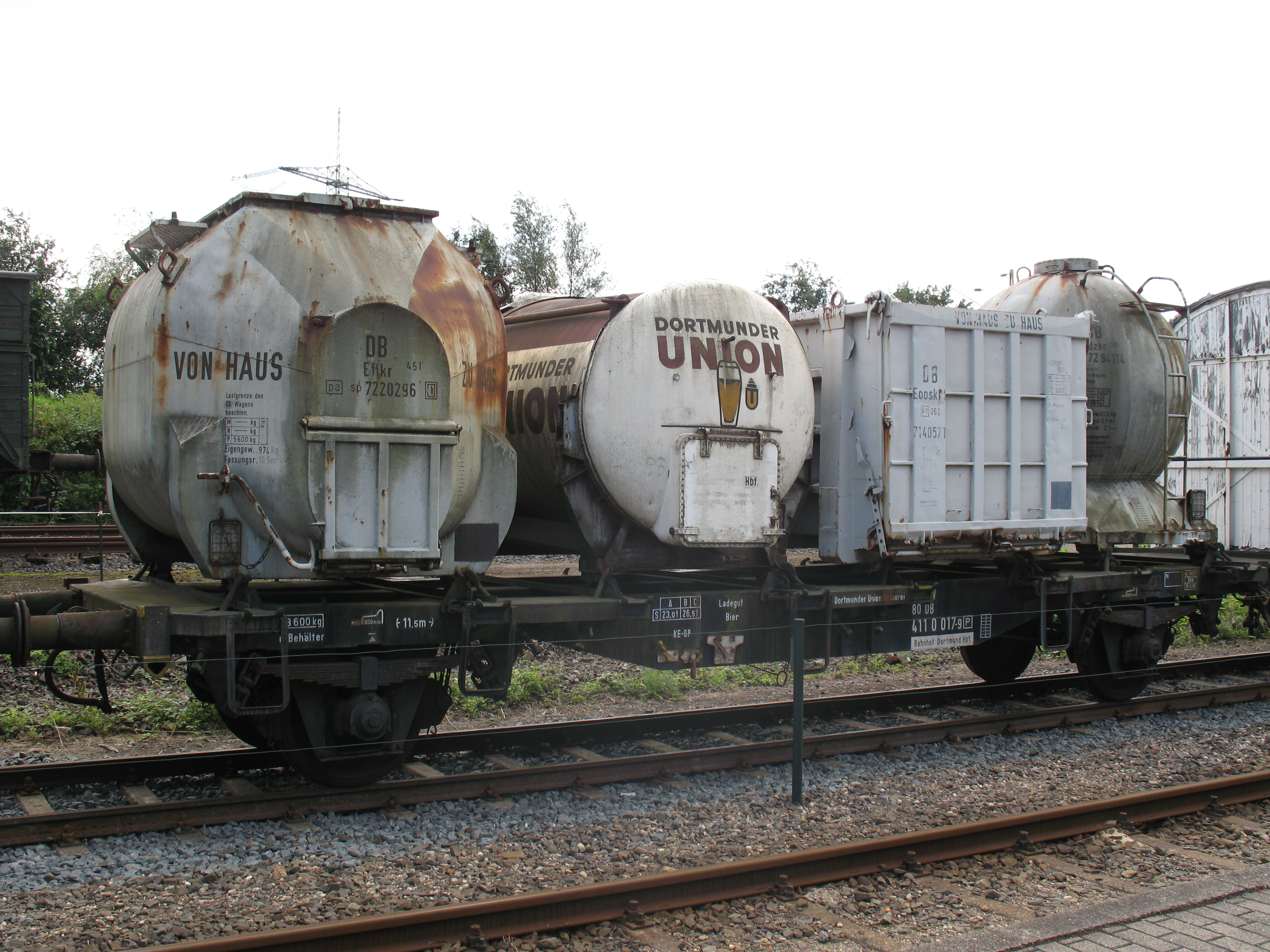
'Behältertragwagen' ("BT / container flatcar") predecessor to the ISO-type, with four mobile containers, including one open-top 'Von Haus zu Haus' ("Door-to-door") type.

Obligatory norms for European containers since 1 July 1933
Heavy types	length (m)	width (m)	height (m)	Total mass [tons]
Closed type 62	3.25	2.15	2.20	5
Closed type 42	2.15	2.15	2.20	5
Open type 61	3.25	2.15	1.10	5
Open type 41	2.15	2.15	1.10	5

Light Type	length (m)	width (m)	height (m)	Total mass [tons]
Closed type 22	2.15	1.05	2.20	2,5
Closed type 201	2.15	1.05	1.10	2,5
Open type 21	2.15	1.05	1.10	2,5

In April 1935 BIC established second standard for European containers:

Obligatory norms for European containers since 1 April 1935
Category	Length (m)	Width (m)	Height (m)	Total mass [tons]
Heavy types
Closed 62	3,25	2.15	2,550	5
Closed 42	2,15	2,15	2,550	5
Open 61	3,25	2,15	1,125	5
Open 41	2,15	2,15	1,125	5
Light Type
Closed 32	1,50	2,15	2,550	2,5
Closed 22	1,05	2,15	2,550	2,5

=== 1951 Zürich conference and UIC standard 590: "Pa-behälter" ===
From 14–23 April 1951, at Zürich Tiefenbrunnen, the Swiss Transportation Association, under auspices of the Bureau International des Containers (BIC), held a comprehensive international exhibition of container systems, aimed to select the best standards for Western Europe. Represented were France, Belgium, the Netherlands, Germany, Switzerland, Great Britain, Italy, and Sweden; with USA observers. The International Union of Railways, UIC, then standardised a container system for Western Europe called 'Porteur-aménagé', or "Pa-Behälter" / "Pa-containers" (UIC 590), based on the Netherlands' systems of waste disposal containers and 'Laadkisten' ("loading crates") for consumer goods. Used since 1934, these were at first 2.5 m × 2 m × 2 m (8.2 ft × 6.6 ft × 6.6 ft) in size, with a maximum gross weight of 3,000 kg (6,600 lb). Fitted with rollers underneath, these units could be loaded and unloaded by drivers of trucks equipped with a winch and telescoping ramps – without any other handling equipment. This enabled the practice of dropping and picking-up of such containers 'Von Haus zu Haus' ("door-to-door").

UIC 590 became the first pan-European standard after World War II. Its system was adopted in Denmark, Belgium, the Netherlands, Luxembourg, West Germany, Switzerland and Sweden. Using the previously BIC-defined sizes, containers of 3.25 m × 2.15 m (10.7 ft × 7.1 ft) were a practical size to be transported lengthwise on most countries' trucks, and transversely on railcars.

=== ISO containers and BIC registration – ISO 6346 ===
Once the larger containers of the ISO-design were gradually popularized, the "Pa-Behälter" system was supplanted, and withdrawn from use by the railways. From the 1970s on, the Pa-system was reutilized in several European countries for transport of waste disposal by trucks, especially open skips for demolition / construction waste.

The Bureau International des Containers (BIC) was elected by the International Standardization Organization (ISO) in the late 1960s as the single registrar office in charge of the registration and protection of the container's owners and operator's identification code. These "BIC codes" were later standardised under ISO 6346. They ensure a unique code-number for every shipping container in the world. They started with the European 'Pa-container' system, and they must still be registered with BIC.

The Customs Convention on Containers (CCC-1972) in a recent amendment, enforced since 2008, also makes reference to the ISO 6346 standard, and code registration with BIC, to allow the free circulation of containers worldwide.

== Facilities ==
The BIC is headquartered 41 rue Réaumur, 75003, Paris, France.
