= ISO 6346 =

International shipping standard

- Freight containers -- Coding, identification and marking
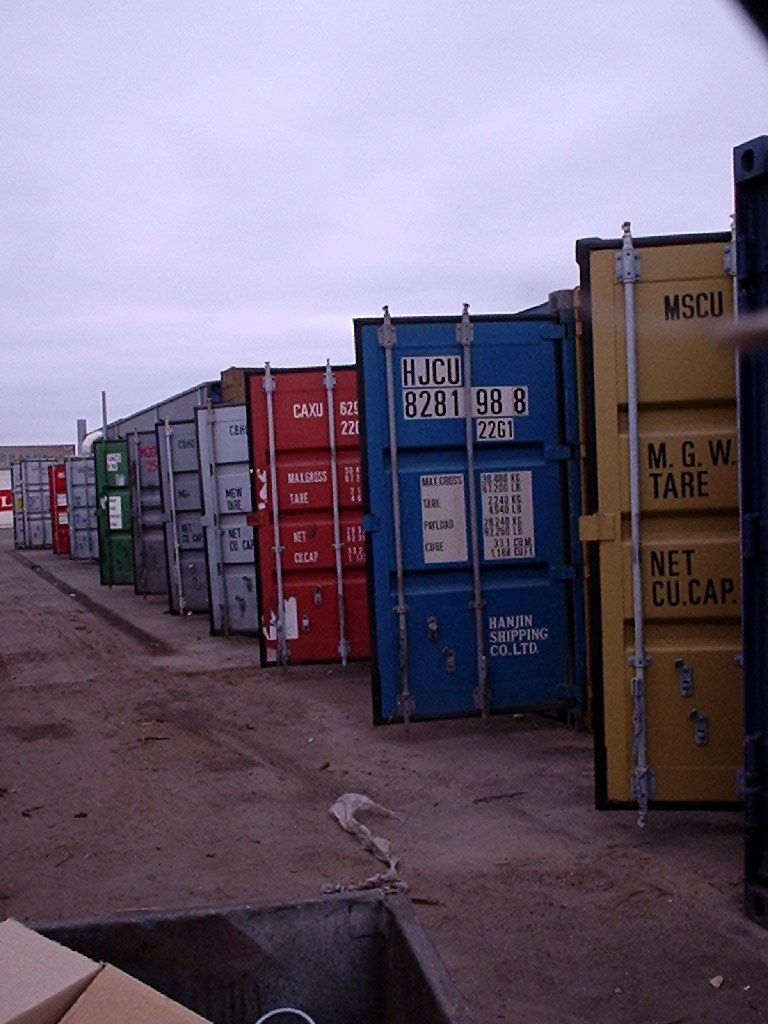
- Several newly-washed containers with identification codes visible
- Latest version: ISO 6346:2022
- Preview version: 1984
- Organization: International Organization for Standardization

ISO 6346 is an international standard covering the coding, identification and marking of intermodal (shipping) containers used within containerized intermodal freight transport by the International Organization for Standardization (ISO). The standard establishes a visual identification system for every container that includes a unique serial number (with check digit), the owner, a country code, a size, type and equipment category as well as any operational marks. The register of container owners is managed by the International Container Bureau (BIC).

== Identification system ==
Example of an ISO 6346 compliant container number:

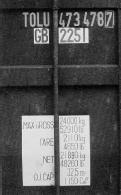
BIC code on the end of a shipping container

The illustrated example is a code for a container owned by Hapag-Lloyd AG.

=== Owner code ===
The owner code consists of three capital letters of the Latin alphabet to indicate the owner or principal operator of the container. Such code needs to be registered at the Bureau International des Containers in Paris to ensure uniqueness worldwide. An owner can apply for more than one code, as normally the first 2 letters are used as the owner code and the third is used to indicate pool (e.g. HLA, HLB, HLX are some Hapag-Lloyd codes to indicate whether container is standard, reefer...)

=== Equipment category identifier ===
The equipment category identifier consists of one of the following capital letters of the Latin alphabet:

- U for all freight containers
- J for detachable freight container-related equipment
- Z for trailers and chassis

Presently, all official BIC container codes end in "U". However, the Association of American Railroads recognizes similar codes for their containers and trailers travelling by rail in North America, though these are not recognized by the BIC and lack check digits.

Under the ISO code, then, only U, J, and Z are in use. The refrigerated (reefer) container is identified by means of the size type code.

=== Serial number ===
The serial number consists of 6 numeric digits, assigned by the owner or operator, uniquely identifying the container within that owner/operator's fleet.

=== Check digit ===
The check digit consists of one numeric digit providing a means of validating the recording and transmission accuracy of the owner code and serial number.

To compute the check digit, the letters have to be converted to numbers. This is done in three steps:

==== Calculation step 1 ====
An equivalent numerical value is assigned to each letter of the alphabet, beginning with 10 for the letter A (11 and multiples thereof are omitted):

A	B	C	D	E	F	G	H	I	J	K	L	M
10	12	13	14	15	16	17	18	19	20	21	23	24

N	O	P	Q	R	S	T	U	V	W	X	Y	Z
25	26	27	28	29	30	31	32	34	35	36	37	38

The individual digits of the serial number keep their numeric value.

==== Calculation step 2 ====
Each of the numbers calculated in step 1 is multiplied by 2^{position}, where position is the exponent to base 2. Position starts at 0, from left to right.

The following table shows the multiplication factors:

1. nbr	2. nbr	3. nbr	4. nbr	5. nbr	6. nbr	7. nbr	8. nbr	9. nbr	10. nbr
2^{0}	2^{1}	2^{2}	2^{3}	2^{4}	2^{5}	2^{6}	2^{7}	2^{8}	2^{9}
1	2	4	8	16	32	64	128	256	512

==== Calculation step 3 ====
1. Sum up all results of Step above
2. Divide them by 11
3. The remainder of the division is the check digit.

If the final difference is 10, then the check digit becomes 0. To ensure that this does not happen the standard recommends that serial numbers should not be used which produce a final difference of 10; however, there are containers in the market which do not follow this recommendation, so handling this case has to be included if a check digit calculator is programmed.

Virtually all programming languages have a modulo operator for step 3; some languages (also) return the decimal portion which must be multiplied by 11 to get a proper modulo. 11 is used as divisor because a container number has 11 letters and digits in total. In step 1 the numbers 11, 22 and 33 are left out as they are multiples of the divisor.

==== Example ====
	C	S	Q	U	3	0	5	4	3	8	Calc.
	13	30	28	32	3	0	5	4	3	8
×	1	2	4	8	16	32	64	128	256	512
	13	60	112	256	48	0	320	512	768	4096	6185 [a]
b) Division by 11:											562.272...
c) Erase decimal digits:											562
d) Multiply by 11:											6182
a) minus d) = Check Digit:											3

=== Practical problems ===
In day-to-day business it happens that containers do appear which do not follow the ISO 6346 identification at all; however, they are fully CSC safety approved containers. Usually these are "shippers owned" containers (SOC), which means that they are not owned by the carrier but supplied by the cargo owners (shippers). They may have no registered owner code and no category identifier and have no check digit. It is advisable to follow ISO 6346 as the absence of a compliant identification code causes problems for both carriers and container terminals to correctly identify the equipment and properly deliver the cargo, because computer systems require ISO 6346-conforming naming and as such missing prefixes are invented. For example, YYYY at the carrier and XXXX at the terminal causes the equipment to mismatch. Moreover, since ISO 6346 identification has become a requirement in international Customs conventions (Customs Conventions on Containers and Istanbul Convention), many Customs Administrations have begun validating that containers are marked as per the standard.

== Size and type codes ==
The codes are compiled of the following elements:

- First character, representing the length (coded)
- Second character, representing the width and height (coded)
- Third and fourth character indicating the type of the container

The following is an overview of the most common codes:

ISO Type Group		ISO Size Type	
Code	Description	Code	Description
20GP	GENERAL PURPOSE CONT.	20G0	GENERAL PURPOSE CONT.
20GP	GENERAL PURPOSE CONT.	20G1	GENERAL PURPOSE CONT.
20HR	ISOLADO CONTAINE REEFER	20H0	INSULATED CONTAINER
20PF	FLAT (FIXED ENDS)	20P1	FLAT (FIXED ENDS)
20TD	TANK CONTAINER	20T3	TANK CONTAINER
20TD	TANK CONTAINER	20T4	TANK CONTAINER
20TD	TANK CONTAINER	20T5	TANK CONTAINER
20TD	TANK CONTAINER	20T6	TANK CONTAINER
20TG	TANK CONTAINER	20T7	TANK CONTAINER
20TG	TANK CONTAINER	20T8	TANK CONTAINER
20TN	TANK CONTAINER	20T0	TANK CONTAINER
20TN	TANK CONTAINER	20T1	TANK CONTAINER
20TN	TANK CONTAINER	20T2	TANK CONTAINER
22BU	BULK CONTAINER	22B0	BULK CONTAINER
22GP	GENERAL PURPOSE CONT.	22G0	GENERAL PURPOSE CONT.
22GP	GENERAL PURPOSE CONT.	22G1	GENERAL PURPOSE CONT.
22HR	INSULATED CONTAINER	22H0	INSULATED CONTAINER
22PC	FLAT (COLLAPSIBLE)	22P3	FLAT (COLLAPSIBLE)
22PC	FLAT (COLLAPSIBLE)	22P8	FLAT (COLL.FLUSH FOLDING)
22PC	FLAT (COLLAPSIBLE)	22P9	FLAT (COLLAPSIBLE)
22PF	FLAT (FIXED ENDS)	22P1	FLAT (FIXED ENDS)
22PF	FLAT (FIXED ENDS)	22P7	FLAT (GENSET CARRIER)
22RC	REEFER CONT.(NO FOOD)	22R9	REEFER CONT.(NO FOOD)
22RS	BUILT-IN GEN. F. POWER SPLY OF REEF	22R7	BUILT-IN GEN. F. POWER SPLY OF REEF
22RT	REEFER CONTAINER	22R1	REEFER CONTAINER
22SN	NAMED CARGO CONTAINER	22S1	NAMED CARGO CONTAINER
22TD	TANK CONTAINER	22T3	TANK CONTAINER
22TD	TANK CONTAINER	22T4	TANK CONTAINER
22TD	TANK CONTAINER	22T5	TANK CONTAINER
22TD	TANK CONTAINER	22T6	TANK CONTAINER
22TG	TANK CONTAINER	22T7	TANK CONTAINER
22TG	TANK CONTAINER	22T8	TANK CONTAINER
22TN	TANK CONTAINER	22T0	TANK CONTAINER
22TN	TANK CONTAINER	22T1	TANK CONTAINER
22TN	TANK CONTAINER	22T2	TANK CONTAINER
22UP	HARDTOP CONTAINER	22U6	HARDTOP CONTAINER
22UT	OPEN TOP CONTAINER	22U1	OPEN TOP CONTAINER
22VH	VENTILATED CONTAINER	22V0	VENTILATED CONTAINER
22VH	VENTILATED CONTAINER	22V2	VENTILATED CONTAINER
22VH	VENTILATED CONTAINER	22V3	VENTILATED CONTAINER
25GP	GP-CONTAINER HIGH CUBE	25G0	GP-CONTAINER HIGH CUBE
26GP	GP-CONTAINER SUPER HIGH CUBE	26G0	GP-CONTAINER SUPER HIGH CUBE
26HR	INSULATED CONTAINER	26H0	INSULATED CONTAINER
28TG	TANK FOR GAS	28T8	TANK FOR GAS
28UT	OPEN TOP (HALF HEIGHT)	28U1	OPEN TOP (HALF HEIGHT)
28VH	VE-HALF-HEIGHT =1448 MM HEIGHT	28V0	VE-HALF-HEIGHT =1448 MM HEIGHT
29PL	PLATFORM	29P0	PLATFORM
2EGP	GEN. PURP. WITHOUT VENT WIDTH 2.5M	2EG0	HIGH CUBE CONT. (WIDTH 2.5M)
42GP	GENERAL PURPOSE CONT.	42G0	GENERAL PURPOSE CONT.
42GP	GENERAL PURPOSE CONT.	42G1	GENERAL PURPOSE CONT.
42HR	INSULATED CONTAINER	42H0	INSULATED CONTAINER
42PC	FLAT (COLLAPSIBLE)	42P3	FLAT (COLLAPSIBLE)
42PC	FLAT (COLLAPSIBLE)	42P8	FLAT (COLL.FLUSH FOLDING)
42PC	FLAT (COLLAPSIBLE)	42P9	FLAT (COLLAPSIBLE)
42PF	FLAT (FIXED ENDS)	42P1	FLAT (FIXED ENDS)
42PS	FLAT (SPACE SAVER)	42P6	FLAT SPACE SAVER
42RC	REEFER CONT.(NO FOOD)	42R9	REEFER CONT.(NO FOOD)
42RS	REEFER CONT.(DIESEL GEN.)	42R3	REEFER CONT.(DIESEL GEN.)
42RT	REEFER CONTAINER	42R1	REEFER CONTAINER
42SN	NAMED CARGO CONTAINER	42S1	NAMED CARGO CONTAINER
42TD	TANK CONTAINER	42T5	TANK CONTAINER
42TD	TANK CONTAINER	42T6	TANK CONTAINER
42TG	TANK CONTAINER	42T8	TANK CONTAINER
42TN	TANK CONTAINER	42T2	TANK CONTAINER
42UP	HARDTOP CONTAINER	42U6	HARDTOP CONTAINER
42UT	OPEN TOP CONTAINER	42U1	OPEN TOP CONTAINER
45BK	BULK CONTAINER	45B3	BULK CONTAINER
45GP	HIGH CUBE CONT.	45G0	HIGH CUBE CONT.
45GP	HIGH CUBE CONT.	45G1	HIGH CUBE CONT.
45PC	FLAT (COLLAPSIBLE)	45P3	FLAT (COLLAPSIBLE)
45PC	FLAT (COLLAPSIBLE)	45P8	FLAT (COLL.FLUSH FOLDING)
45RC	REEFER CONT.(NO FOOD)	45R9	REEFER CONT.(NO FOOD)
45RT	REEFER HIGHCUBE CONTAINER	45R1	REEFER HIGHCUBE CONTAINER
45UT	OPEN TOP CONTAINER	45U1	OPEN TOP CONTAINER
45UP	HIGH CUBE HARDTOP CONT.	45U6	HIGH CUBE HARDTOP CONT.
46HR	INSULATED CONTAINER	46H0	INSULATED CONTAINER
48TG	TANK FOR GAS	48T8	TANK FOR GAS
49PL	PLATFORM	49P0	PLATFORM
4CGP	GP CONTAINER	4CG0	GP CONTAINER (WIDTH 2.5 M)
L0GP	LOW CUBE CONT.	L0G1	LOW CUBE CONT.
L2GP	STANDARD CONT.	L2G1	STANDARD CONT.
L5GP	HIGH CUBE CONT.	L5G1	HIGH CUBE CONT.

Use the below to calculate size/type of a less commonly used ISO 6346 containers:

ISO Length Codes		Second size code character		
Code	Container length	Code	Container height	Width
1	10 ft (3,048 mm)	0	8 ft (2,438 mm)	8 ft (2,438 mm)
1	10 ft (3,048 mm)	2	8 ft 6 in (2,591 mm)	8 ft (2,438 mm)
2	20 ft (6,096 mm)	2	8 ft 6 in (2,591 mm)	8 ft (2,438 mm)
3	30 ft (9,144 mm)	4	9 ft (2,743 mm)	8 ft (2,438 mm)
4	40 ft (12,192 mm)	5	9 ft 6 in (2,896 mm)	8 ft (2,438 mm)
5	45 ft (13,716 mm)	5	9 ft 6 in (2,896 mm)	8 ft (2,438 mm)
B	24 ft (7,315 mm)	6	> 9 ft 6 in (2,896 mm)	8 ft (2,438 mm)
C	24 ft 6 in (7,468 mm)	8	4 ft 3 in (1,295 mm)	8 ft (2,438 mm)
G	41 ft (12,497 mm)	9	<= 4 ft (1,219 mm)	
H	43 ft (13,106 mm)	C	8 ft 6 in (2,591 mm)	8 ft (2,438 mm) < x ≤ 8 ft 2 in (2,500 mm)
L (1995 edition, replaced by 5 in the 2022 edition)	45 ft (13,716 mm)	D	9 ft (2,743 mm)	8 ft (2,438 mm) < x ≤ 8 ft 2 in (2,500 mm)
M	48 ft (14,630 mm)	E	9 ft 6 in (2,896 mm)	8 ft (2,438 mm) < x ≤ 8 ft 2 in (2,500 mm)
N	49 ft (14,935 mm)	F	> 9 ft 6 in (2,896 mm)	8 ft (2,438 mm) < x ≤ 8 ft 2 in (2,500 mm)

ISO Type Codes
Code (Alt Code)	Description
G0 (GA)	General - Openings at one or both ends
G1 (GB)	General - Passive vents at upper part of cargo space
G2 (GD)	General - Openings at one or both ends + full openings on one or both sides
G3 (GG)	General - Openings at one or both ends + partial openings on one or both sides
V0 (VA)	Fantainer - Non-mechanical, vents at lower and upper parts of cargo space
V2 (VD)	Fantainer - Mechanical ventilation system located internally
V4 (VEJ)	Fantainer - Mechanical ventilation system located externally
R0 (RA)	Integral Reefer - Mechanically refrigerated
R1 (RB)	Integral Reefer - Mechanically refrigerated and heated
R2 (RD)	Integral Reefer - Self-powered mechanically refrigerated
R3 (RG)	Integral Reefer - Self-powered mechanically refrigerated and heated
H0 (HA)	Refrigerated or heated with removable equipment located externally; heat transfer coefficient K=0.4W/M2.K
H1 (HB)	Refrigerated or heated with removable equipment located internally
H2 (HD)	Refrigerated or heated with removable equipment located externally; heat transfer coefficient K=0.7W/M2.K
H5 (HM)	Insulated - Heat transfer coefficient K=0.4W/M2.K
H6 (HV)	Insulated - Heat transfer coefficient K=0.7W/M2.K
U0 (UA)	Open Top - Openings at one or both ends
U1 (UB)	Open Top - Idem + removable top members in end frames
U2 (UD)	Open Top - Openings at one or both ends + openings at one or both sides
U3 (UG)	Open Top - Idem + removable top members in end frames
U4 (UJ)	Open Top - Openings at one or both ends + partial on one and full at other side
U5 (UM)	Open Top - Complete, fixed side and end walls ( no doors )
T0 (TA)	Tank - Non-dangerous liquids, minimum pressure 0.45 bar
T1 (TB)	Tank - Non-dangerous liquids, minimum pressure 1.50 bar
T2 (TD)	Tank - Non-dangerous liquids, minimum pressure 2.65 bar
T3 (TG)	Tank - Dangerous liquids, minimum pressure 1.50 bar
T4 (TJ)	Tank - Dangerous liquids, minimum pressure 2.65 bar
T5 (TM)	Tank - Dangerous liquids, minimum pressure 4.00 bar
T6 (TV)	Tank - Dangerous liquids, minimum pressure 6.00 bar
T7 (TW)	Tank - Gases, minimum pressure 9.10 bar
T8 (TX)	Tank - Gases, minimum pressure 22.00 bar
T9 (TY)	Tank - Gases, minimum pressure to be decided
B0 (BA)	Bulk - Closed
B1 (BB)	Bulk - Airtight
B3 (BG)	Bulk - Horizontal discharge, test pressure 1.50 bar
B4 (BJ)	Bulk - Horizontal discharge, test pressure 2.65 bar
B5 (BM)	Bulk - Tipping discharge, test pressure 1.50 bar
B6 (BV)	Bulk - Tipping discharge, test pressure 2.65 bar
P0 (PA)	Flat or Bolster - Plain platform
P1 (PB)	Flat or Bolster - Two complete and fixed ends
P2 (PD)	Flat or Bolster - Fixed posts, either free-standing or with removable top member
P3 (PG)	Flat or Bolster - Folding complete end structure
P4 (PJ)	Flat or Bolster - Folding posts, either free-standing or with removable top member
P5 (PM)	Flat or Bolster - Open top, open ends (skeletal)
S0 (SA)	Livestock carrier
S1 (SB)	Automobile carrier
S2 (SD)	Live fish carrier

The alt code is used for containers with a reduced maximum stacking and/or racking capacity.

== Country code (optional) ==
The country code consists of two capital letters of the Latin alphabet as described in ISO 3166-1. It indicates the country where the code is registered not the nationality of the owner or operator of the container. The letters of the code shall not be less than 100 mm (3.9 in) high.

== Mandatory operational marks ==
Operational marks are intended solely to convey information requested for the movement of containers or give visual warnings. They relate to

- the weight of containers
- a symbol to denote air-surface container
- a sign warning of overhead electrical danger
- height marks for containers higher than 2,590 mm (8 ft 6 in)

== See also ==
- Standard Carrier Alpha Code
- UIC wagon numbers

The following is a list of further freight container related ISO specifications, where not all have an article assigned yet (you can help improve Wikipedia and start one):

- ISO 668 - Freight containers - Classification, dimensions and ratings
- ISO 830 - Freight containers - Terminology
- ISO 1161 - Freight containers - Corner fittings - Specification
- ISO 1496 - Freight containers - Specification and testing
- ISO 2308 - Hooks for lifting freight containers of up to 30 tons capacity - Basic requirements
- ISO 3874 - Freight containers - Handling and securing
- ISO 8323 - Freight containers - Air/surface (intermodal) general purpose containers - Specification and tests
- ISO 9669 - Freight containers - Interface connections for tank containers
- ISO 9711 - Freight containers - Information related to containers on board vessels
- ISO 9897 - Container equipment data exchange (CEDEX)
- ISO 10368 - Freight thermal containers - Remote condition monitoring
- ISO 10374 - Freight containers - Automatic identification
