= Hood =

Hood may refer to:

== Covering ==
=== Apparel ===
- Hood (headgear), type of head covering
  - Article of academic dress
  - Bondage hood, sex toy
- Hoodie, hooded sweatshirt

=== Anatomy ===
- Clitoral hood, a hood of skin surrounding the clitoris
- Hood, a flap of skin behind the head of a cobra

=== Other coverings ===
- Fume hood, piece of laboratory safety equipment
- Hood (car), covering over the engine compartment in a motor vehicle ('bonnet' in most Commonwealth countries)
- Kitchen hood, exhaust system for a stove or cooktop
- Lens hood, device used to block light from creating glare in photographs

=== Rail transport uses ===
- Hood (rail transport), a rigid cover to protect a load on a flat wagon or a coil car
- Hood unit, a type of diesel or electric locomotive
  - Long hood
  - Short hood

== Art, entertainment and media ==
=== Fictional entities ===
- The Hood (Marvel Comics), fictional Marvel Comics character
- Hood (Malazan), fictional god in the Malazan Book of the Fallen universe
- Hood (Thunderbirds), fictional character in the Thunderbirds TV series
- Hood (My Hero Academia), fictional Nomu character in the manga series My Hero Academia
- "The Hood", the vigilante name given to Oliver Queen in season 1 of the TV series Arrow

=== Films ===
- Hood, an unrealized film by The Wachowskis

=== Gaming ===
- Hood: Outlaws & Legends, a 2021 video game

=== Literature ===
- Hood (novel), a 1995 novel by Emma Donoghue
- Hood (2006), the first book of the King Raven Trilogy, by Stephen R. Lawhead

=== Music ===
- Hood (band), British indie rock band
- Hoods (band), American punk band

== Enterprises and institutions ==
- Hood College, a liberal arts college in Frederick, Maryland, United States
- HP Hood, an American food manufacturer

== Slang ==
- Hood, a slang term for neighborhood
  - The hood, a North American slang term for ghettos and inner cities, especially for Black American ghettos

== People ==
- Hood (surname), a list of people
- Robin Hood, medieval English folk hero
- hood, a slang shortening of hoodlum

== Places ==
=== Iran ===
- Hood, Iran, a village in Fars Province of Iran

=== United States ===
- Fort Hood (now Fort Cavazos), a U.S. Army post near Killeen, Texas
- Hood, California, a census-designated place in the United States
- Hood Canal, a fjord off Puget Sound in the U.S. state of Washington
- Hood County, Texas, a county in the U.S. state of Texas
- Hood River (disambiguation)
- Mount Hood, the tallest mountain in the U.S. state of Oregon
  - Mount Hood, Oregon, an unincorporated community named for the mountain
  - Mount Hood Parkdale, Oregon, the name of the post office that serves Mount Hood, Oregon

== Transportation ==
- List of ships called HMS Hood
- Hood Steamer, an early (1900–01) American manufacturer of steam cars in Lanark, Illinois, see List of defunct automobile manufacturers of the United States

== Other uses ==
- HOOD method, software design method
- NASDAQ ticker symbol for Robinhood (company)
- Hood, codename for the largest secretly detonated thermonuclear device over United States territory; see Operation Plumbbob

== See also ==
- Da Hood (disambiguation)
- Hoodwink (disambiguation)
- Hoodlum (disambiguation)
- Robin Hood (disambiguation)
