= Harry Hood =

Harry Hood may refer to:

- Harry Hood (footballer) (1944–2019), Scottish footballer
- "Harry Hood" (song), Phish live song
- Harry Hood (Canadian football) (1926–1954), Canadian football player

== See also ==
- Harold Hood (1916–2005)
- Hood (surname)
