= Hood (surname) =

Hood is an English and Scottish surname. Notable people with the surname include:

== Real people ==
=== Academics ===
- Alan Hood, astronomy professor at the University of St Andrews
- Christopher Hood (1947–2025), Oxford professor
- Hugh Hood (1928–2000), Canadian novelist and professor
- John Hood (born 1952), New Zealand businessman and administrator
- Joseph Douglas Hood (1889–1966), American entomologist
- Leroy Hood (born 1938), American biologist
- Paul Hood (academic administrator) (died 1668), English academic administrator
- Sinclair Hood (1917–2021), Irish archaeologist and academic
- William Hood, American art historian

=== Athletes ===
- Bruce Hood (1936–2018), Canadian author, businessman, politician, and NHL referee
- Colton Hood (born 2005), American football player
- Edmund Hood (1898–1990), Australian rules footballer
- Elijah Hood (born 1996), American football player
- Enoch Hood (1861–1940), English footballer
- Frank Hood (1908–1955), American football player
- Graham Hood (born 1972), Canadian middle-distance runner
- Leslie Hood (1876–1932), English rugby player
- Marjorie Hood (20th century), American baseball player
- Peter Hood, Chairman of the Bradford Bulls (an English rugby league club)
- Roderick Hood (born 1981), American football player
- Rodney Hood (born 1992), American basketball player
- Ted Hood (1927–2013), American yachtsman and naval architect

=== Entertainers ===
- Adam Hood (21st century), American musician
- Calum Hood (born 1996), Australian bassist from the band 5 Seconds of Summer
- Darla Hood (1931–1979), American actress
- Dave Hood (born 1950), American actor
- David Hood (born 1943), American musician
- Dictynna Hood, British film director and screenwriter
- Florence Hood (1880–1968), Australian-born Canadian violinist
- Gavin Hood (born 1963), South African director
- Joey Hood (born 1976), voice actor
- Kate Hood, Australian actress
- Kit Hood (1943–2020), Canadian television director
- Morag Hood (1942–2002), Scottish actress
- Patterson Hood (born 1964), American guitarist, singer and songwriter
- Rappin' Hood (born 1971), Brazilian rapper, singer, record producer and television presenter
- Robert Hood (born 1965), American music producer and DJ

=== Military personnel ===
- Admiral Hood (disambiguation), multiple people with the surname who were admirals
- Alexander Hood (1758–1798), English Royal Navy officer
- Alexander Hood, 1st Viscount Bridport (1726–1814), English Royal Navy officer
- Arthur Hood, 1st Baron Hood of Avalon (1824–1901), English Royal Navy officer
- Charles Hood (1826–1883), English British Army officer
- Francis Grosvenor Hood (1809–1855), English British Army officer
- Horace Hood (1870–1916), English Royal Navy admiral
- John Hood (naval officer) (1859–1919), American U.S. Navy admiral
- John Bell Hood (1831–1879), American Confederate general
- Michael John Hood (born 1967), Royal Canadian Air Force Lieutenant General, Commander RCAF
- Samuel Hood, 1st Viscount Hood (1724–1816), English Royal Navy officer
- Sir Samuel Hood, 1st Baronet (1762–1814), English Royal Navy officer
- Washington Hood (1808–1840), American soldier and surveyor

=== Politicians ===
- Alexander Fuller-Acland-Hood, 1st Baron St Audries (1853–1917), British Conservative Party politician
- Clark L. Hood (1847–1920), American politician
- Dave Hood Jr. (1954–2019), American politician and judge
- Dennis Hood (born 1970), Australian politician
- Glenda Hood (born 1950), former secretary of state for Florida
- Jim Hood (born 1962), Attorney General of Mississippi
- Jimmy Hood (1948–2017), politician in the United Kingdom
- John Hood (Australian politician) (1817–1877), MP in Victoria, Australia
- Morris Hood Jr. (1934–1998), American politician
- Morris Hood III (1965–2020), American politician
- Nicholas Hood (1923–2016), American politician
- Raymond W. Hood (1936–2002), American politician
- Ron Hood (1969–2025), American politician
- Samuel Hood, 2nd Baron Bridport (1788–1868), British politician and peer

=== Writers ===
- Ann Hood (born 1956), American novelist and short story writer
- Basil Hood (1864–1917), British librettist and lyricist
- Daniel Hood, American novelist
- Sam Hood (1872–1953), Australian photographer and photojournalist
- Sean Hood (born 1966), American screenwriter
- Stuart Hood (1915–2011), Scottish novelist and former controller of the BBC
- Thomas Hood (1799–1845), British poet and humorist
- Tom Hood (1835–1874), English humorist and playwright

=== Others ===
- Archibald Hood (1823–1902), Scottish coalowner
- Cherry Hood (born 1959), Australian artist
- George Hood, (1891–1928), New Zealand pioneer aviator who perished attempting the first flight across the Tasman Sea.
- James Hood (1942–2013), one of the first black students to enroll in the University of Alabama
- Nora Hood (c. 1836–1871), Aboriginal Australian religious figure
- Rance Hood (1941–2024), Comanche artist
- Raymond Hood (1881–1934), early twentieth-century architect
- William Charles Hood (1824–1870), English doctor

== Fictional characters ==
- Baby Bonnie Hood, fictional character
- Little Red Riding Hood, fairytale character
- Lucas Hood, main character in the Cinemax television series Banshee
- Red Hood, fictional character in DC Comics
- Robin Hood, English folk hero from medieval legends
- Fleet Admiral Lord Terrence Hood, a fictional character in the Halo video-game franchise
