= Flat wagon =

Railway goods wagon

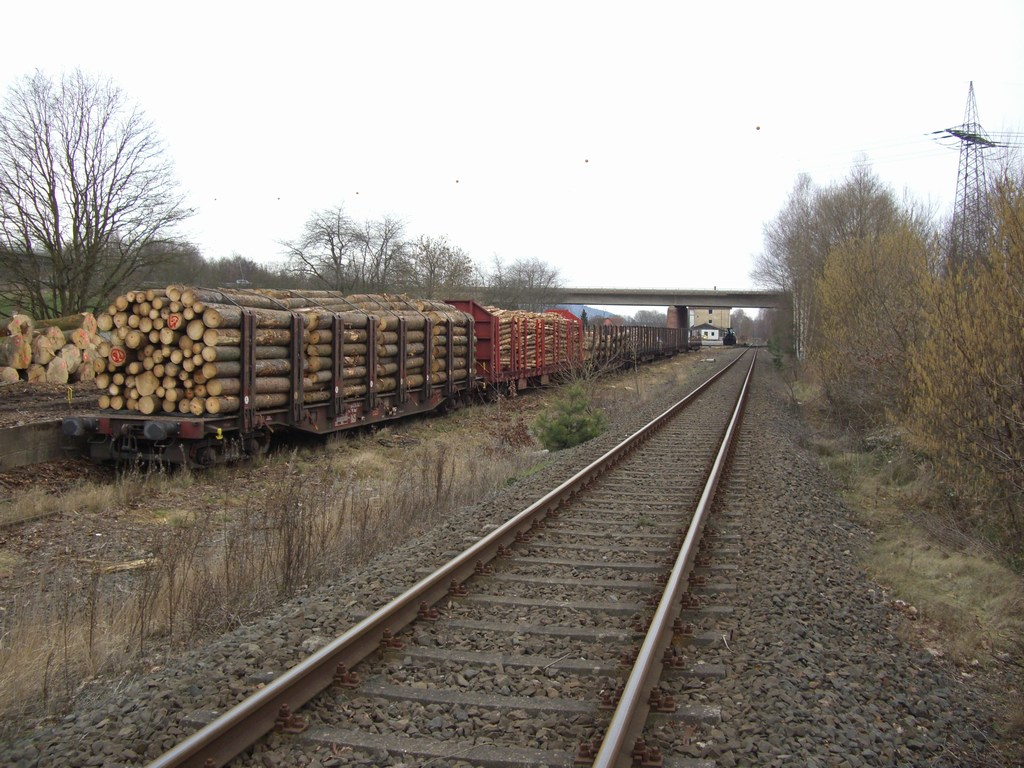
Flat wagons for carrying timber: the Class Snps^{719} (front) and the Class Roos-t^{642} (behind)

Flat wagons (sometimes flat beds, flats or rail flats, US: flatcars), as classified by the International Union of Railways (UIC), are railway goods wagons that have a flat, usually full-length, deck (or 2 decks on car transporters) and little or no superstructure. By contrast, open wagons have high side and end walls and covered goods wagons have a fixed roof and sides. Flat wagons are often designed for the transportation of goods that are not weather-sensitive. Some flat wagons are able to be covered completely by tarpaulins or hoods and are therefore suitable for the transport of weather-sensitive goods. Unlike a "goods wagon with opening roof", the loading area of a flat is entirely open and accessible once the cover is removed.

Flats form a large proportion of goods wagons; for example in 1998 they comprised 40% of the total goods fleet owned by the German carrier, DB, the overwhelming majority of which were flat wagons with bogies.

Typical goods transported by these railway wagons are: vehicles, engines, large pipes, metal beams, wire coils, wire mesh, half-finished steel products, (sheets, coils, pipes, bars and plates), containers, rails, sleepers and complete sections of railway track. Gravel, sand and other bulk goods are transported on flat wagons with side panels.

== International UIC classification ==
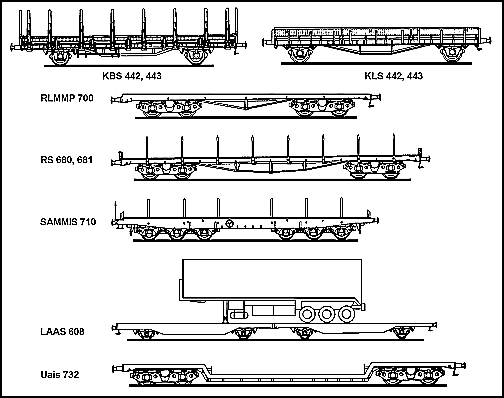
Differents types of flat wagons and one low-deck wagon

Flat wagons are classified by the UIC into:

- Ordinary goods wagons with category letters "K", "O" and "R", and
- Special goods wagons with category letters "L" and "S".

The main difference between the ordinary and special types of flat wagon is that the former always have to have a flat deck that can be driven on, whereas the special types do not have to be so designed. Within both types of flat wagon, there are variants with separate axles as well as bogie wagons.

In addition numerous other terms are used to classify flat wagons according to their purpose, but without clear and comprehensive specifications.

=== UIC standard goods wagons ===
Attempts by the International Union of Railways (UIC) to standardise flat wagons go back to the 1950s. These efforts led to the establishment of characteristics for so-called "standard wagons". Standardised flat wagons are specified in the following UIC pamphlets:

- UIC 571-1 – Standard wagons – ordinary two-axle wagons
- UIC 571-2 – Standard wagons – ordinary bogie wagons
- UIC 571-3 – Standard wagons – Special-purpose wagons
- UIC 571-4 – Standard wagons – Wagons for combined transport

The implementation of these guidelines is partly binding and partly voluntary for members of the UIC. Since the end of 1977, flat wagons that partially conform to these guidelines are identified by the designation "UIC". Flat beds that comply fully with the leaflets, and are therefore true UIC standard wagons, are given the designation "UIS St".

=== K: Ordinary two-axle flat wagons ===
The Class K flats were originally one of the largest families of goods wagons, not least in Germany, thanks to the many older type stake wagons (stanchion wagons) that were assigned to it. The bulk of their work has since been taken over by special flat wagons. By 1998, DB only had 10,000 of this type left.

The majority of ordinary two-axle flat beds built since the 1950s were those with folding sides and short swivelling stanchions of UIC type 1 with, at least in Germany, an axle base of only 8 metres (26 ft 2 15/16 in).

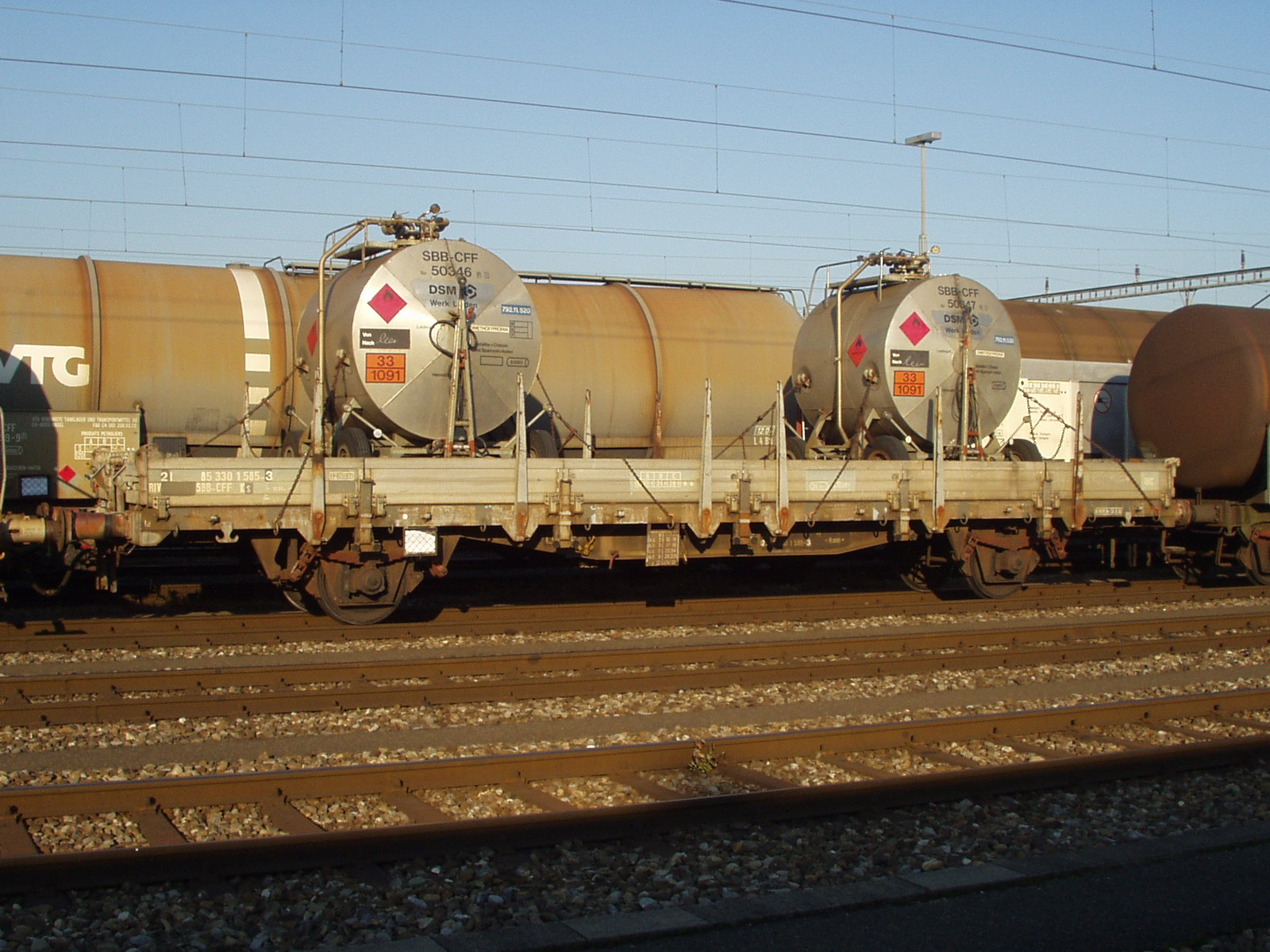
Flat wagons of Class Ks with standard dimensions and swivelling stanchions, loaded with Swiss containers

| | UIC 571-1: Ordinary two-axle wagons | | | |
| Wagon type | Type 1 | Type 2 | Type 3A | Type 3B |
| UIC class | Ks | Kns/Kjns | Kins/Kijns | Kilns/Kijlns |
|---|---|---|---|---|
| Axle base | 9.00 m 29 ft 6 3/8 in | 10.00 m 32 ft 9 3/4 in | 10.00 m 32 ft 9 3/4 in | 10.00 m 32 ft 9 3/4 in |
| Length over buffers | 13.86 m 45 ft 5 5/8 in | 16.55 m 54 ft 3 5/8 in | 16.55 m 54 ft 3 5/8 in | 16.55 m 54 ft 3 5/8 in |
| Loading length, min. | 12.50 m 41 ft 1/8 in | 14.5 to 15.1 m 47 ft 6 7/8 in to 49 ft 6 1/2 in | 14.5 to 15.1 m 47 ft 6 7/8 in to 49 ft 6 1/2 in | 14.5 to 15.1 m 47 ft 6 7/8 in to 49 ft 6 1/2 in |
| Loading area, about> | 35 m^{2} 380 sq ft | 41.3 to 43.0 m^{2} 445 to 463 sq ft | 41.3 to 43.0 m^{2} 445 to 463 sq ft | 41.3 to 43.0 m^{2} 445 to 463 sq ft |
| Own weight, max. | 13.5 t 13.3 long tons; 14.9 short tons | 16.0 t 15.7 long tons; 17.6 short tons | 17.5 t 17.2 long tons; 19.3 short tons | 17.5 t 17.2 long tons; 19.3 short tons |

In recent years new K wagons have been developed. These have fixed ends and a tarpaulin cover and are therefore also suitable for hygroscopic goods. Their designation is Kils, based on the UIC classification of goods wagons.

In addition to the normal letters indicating length and weight (k, kk, n, m and mm) the Type K may also have the following index letters:

- b – with long (side-)stanchions (usually designed as insertable stanchions)
- i – with removable cover and non-removable ends (tarpaulin wagon) and
- l – without stanchions
- p – without sides (not used with i)

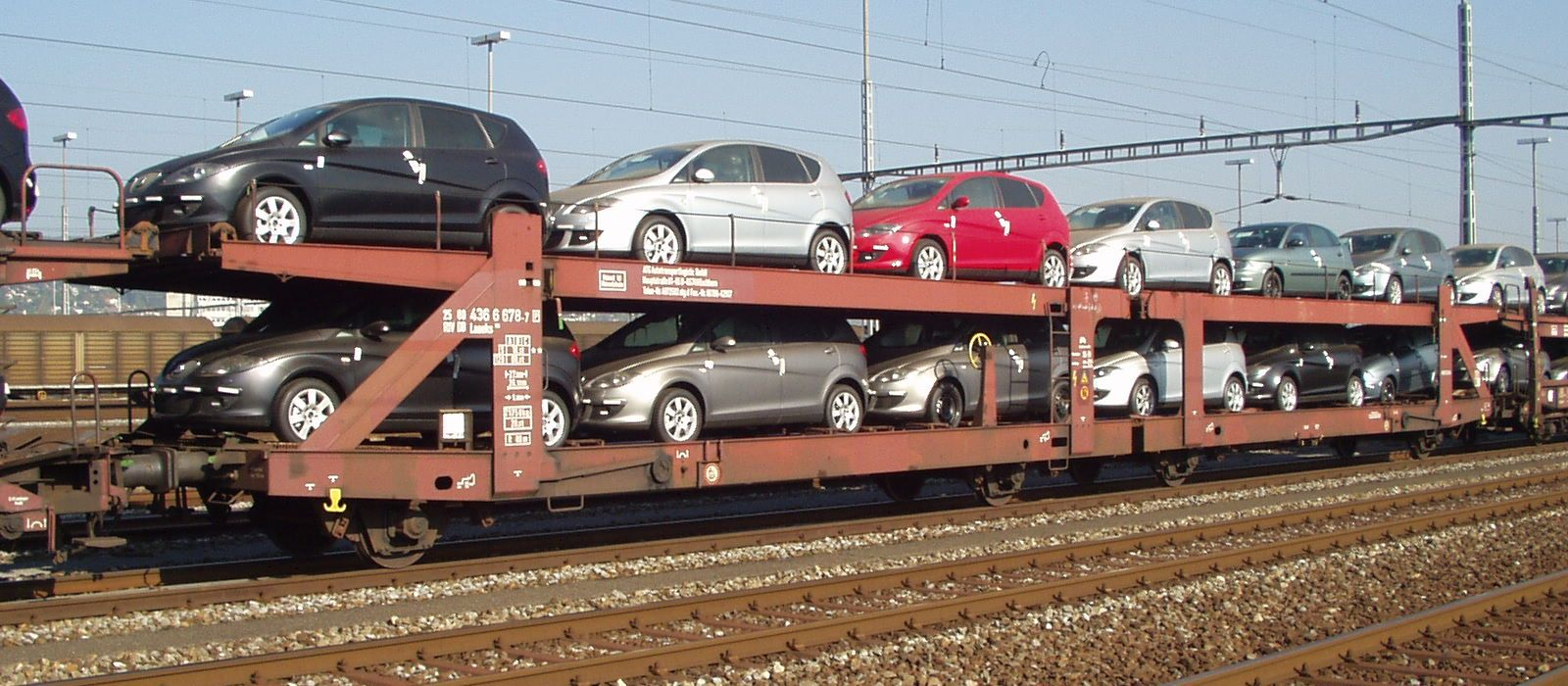
Double-decker car transporter of Class Laaeks

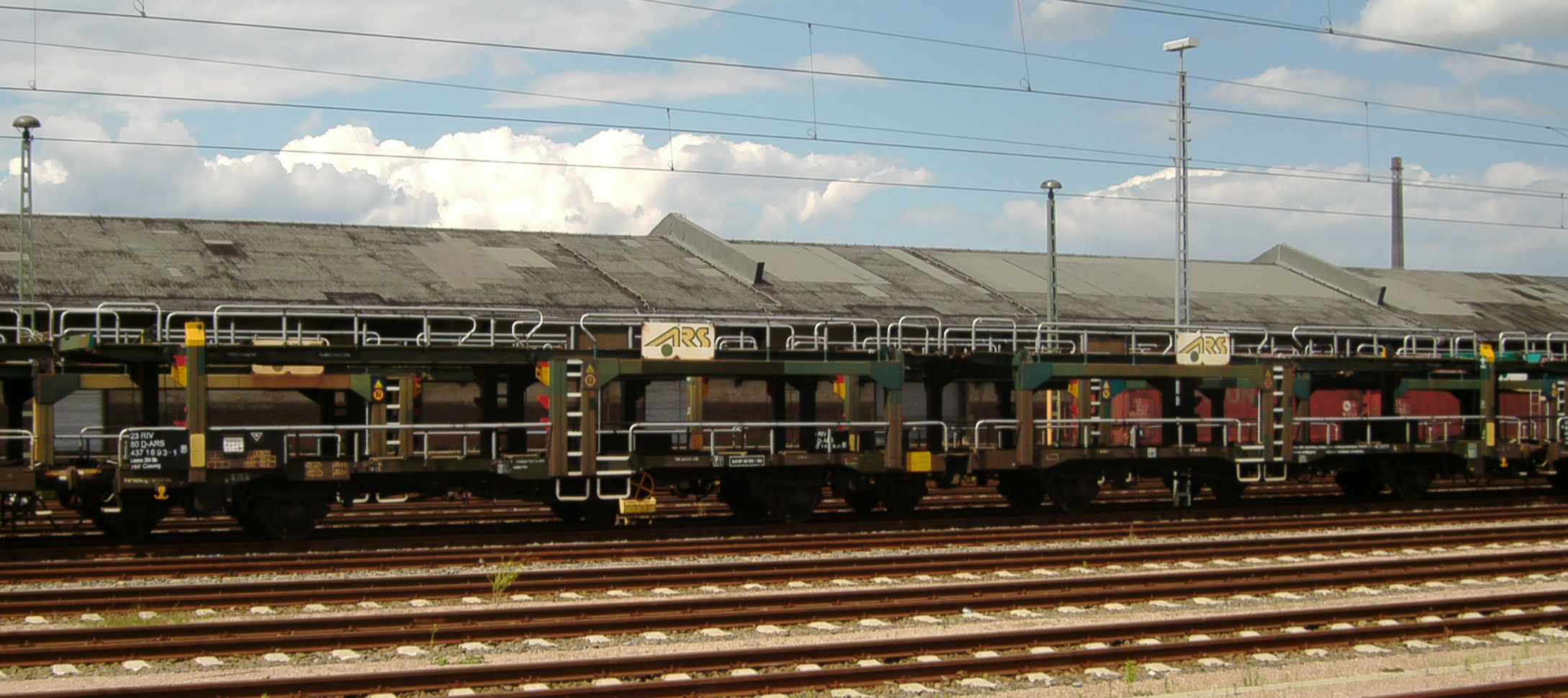
Double-decker flat wagons for car transportation owned by ARS

=== L: Special flat wagons with separate axles ===
Today this class contains:

- Three and four-axle car transporters (see below) with one or two decks, and
- Two-axle container wagons

Only of historic significance, by contrast, are pod wagons (see below) and cradle wagons (see below). As a rule, L wagons do not have stanchions.

The most important index letters for basic classification of current types are:

- a – articulated wagon with 3 axles,
- aa – double wagon with 4 axles,
- d – fitted out for the transport of motor cars without deck,
- e – with decks for the transport of motor cars (double decker),
- g – fitted for the transport of containers (Container wagons).

The UIC has standardised three types of L wagon, the Class Lgss being based heavily on the Class Ks (see above):

| | UIC 571-3: Special goods wagons | | UIC 571-4: Wagons for combined transport |
| Wagon type | Double-decker for vehicle transport | | Container wagon |
| Type | Type 1 − Double wagon | Type 2 − Articulated wagon | Type 5 |
| Class | Laaes | Laes | Lgss |
|---|---|---|---|
| Axle base | 2 × 9.00 m 29 ft 6 3/8 in | 2 × 10.40 m 34 ft 1 1/2 in | 9.00 m 29 ft 6 3/8 in |
| Length over buffers | 27.00 m 88 ft 7 in | | 13.86 m 45 ft 5 5/8 in |
| Loading length, min. | 26.5 + 26.1 m 86 ft 11 1/4 in + 85 ft 7 1/2 in | | 12.52 m 41 ft 7/8 in |
| Own weight, max. | 30.0 t 29.5 long tons; 33.1 short tons | 27.0 t 26.6 long tons; 29.8 short tons | 12.0 t 11.8 long tons; 13.2 short tons |

=== O: Mixed open flat wagons ===
The standard mixed open flat wagon group has folding sides, stanchions and two or three axles.

The most important index letters for this group are:

- a – with 3 axles,
- k – maximum load < 20 t (20 long tons; 22 short tons)
- kk – maximum load 20 to 25 t (20 to 25 long tons; 22 to 28 short tons)
- l – without stanchions
- m – loading length 9 to 12 m (29 ft 6 3/8 in to 39 ft 4 1/2 in)
- mm – loading length < 9 m (29 ft 6 3/8 in)
- n – with 2 axles: maximum load > 30 t (30 long tons; 33 short tons), with 3 axles: maximum load > 40 t (39 long tons; 44 short tons)

The dimensions of the UIC standard wagon largely conform to the considerably more common Class Ks wagon (see above):

| | UIC 571-1: Ordinary two-axle wagons |
| Wagon type | Open/Flat multi-purpose wagon |
| Class | Os |
|---|---|
| Axle base | 8.00 m 26 ft 3 in |
| Length over buffers | 13.86 m 45 ft 5 5/8 in |
| Loading length, min. | 12.61 m 41 ft 4 1/2 in |
| Loading area, about | 36 m^{2} 390 sq ft |
| Loading volume, about | 29 m^{2} 310 sq ft |
| Unladen weight, max. | 14.0 t 13.8 long tons; 15.4 short tons |

=== R: Ordinary flat wagons with bogies ===
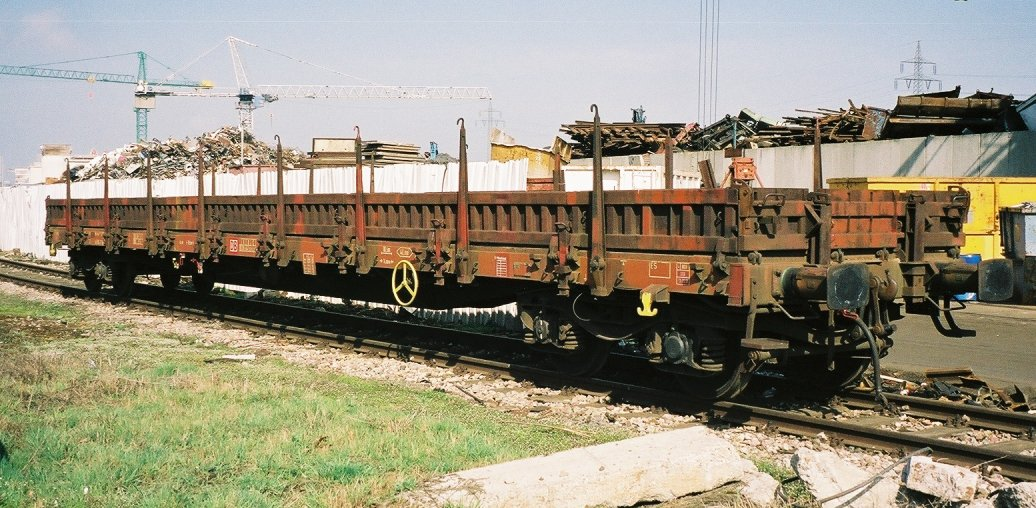
Flat wagons of Class Res with sides conforming to UIC Type 1

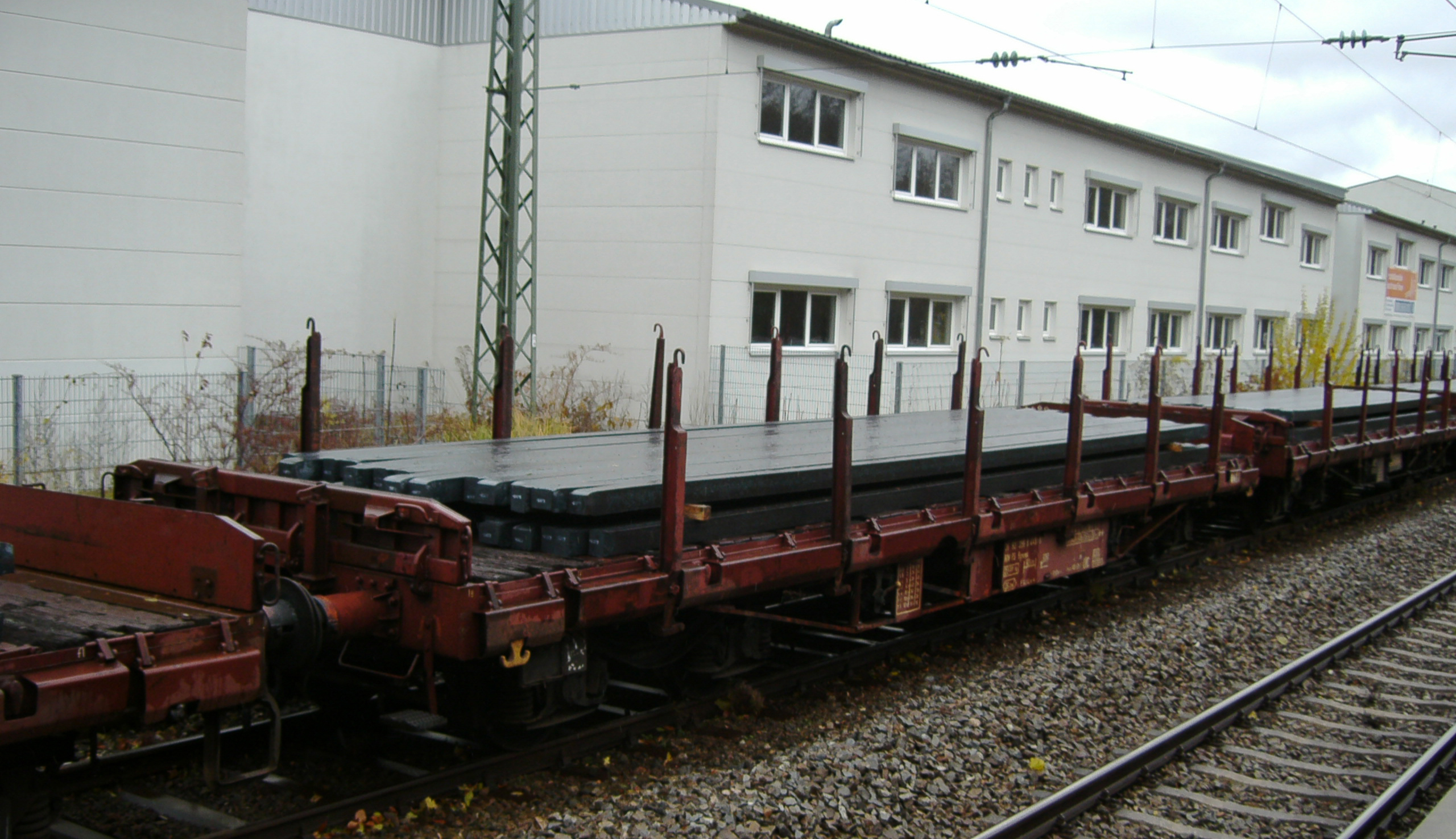
Shorter flat wagons of Class Rgmms conforming to UIC Type 2. Also suitable for container transport. Note the stanchions

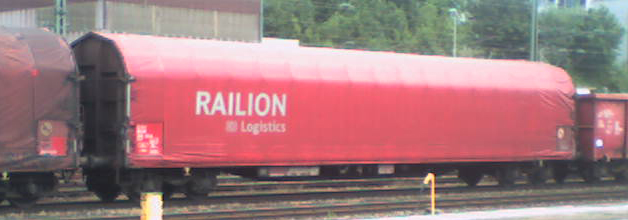
Flat wagons of Class Rilns^{654} with tarpaulin hood without stanchions

The exclusively four-axle bogie wagons of Class R are equipped with a solid, level deck, usually made of wood, and, unless indicated otherwise by the code letters, also furnished with stanchions and end walls. Most types have short, removable, swivelling stanchions. They are especially suited to the transport of long steel elements, building materials, machines and large vehicles. In the 1990s, the DB purchased Class R wagons with long, sturdy, light metal stanchions and high end walls for the increasing amount of log transport required. In 1998, the DB had about 17,000 R wagons in service.

The most important index letters for distinguishing the basic types are as follows:

- e – with drop sides,
- g – fitted for the transport of containers (Container wagons),
- h – fitted out for the transport of steel coils, eye to side,
- i – with removable cover and non-removable ends (tarpaulin wagon),
- l – without stanchions,
- mm – very short loading length (less than 15 m or 49 ft 2 1/2 in),
- oo – with non-removable ends, 2 m (6 ft 6 3/4 in) or more in height and without covers (wagons for timber transport).

The UIC has specified two standard R wagons, both of which are very common e.g. in Germany. In the mid-1970s there was a switchover to newly built wagons with foldable sides.

| | UIC 571-2: Ordinary four-axle bogie wagons | |
| Wagon type | Type 1 | Type 2 |
| Class | R(e)s | R(e)mms |
|---|---|---|
| Pivot pitch | 14.86 m 48 ft 9 in | 9.00 m 29 ft 6 3/8 in |
| Length over buffers | 19.90 m 65 ft 3 1/2 in | 14.04 m 46 ft 3/4 in |
| Loading length, min. | 18.50 m 60 ft 8 3/8 in | 12.64 m 41 ft 5 5/8 in |
| Loading area, about | 51 m^{2} 550 sq ft | 35 m^{2} 380 sq ft |
| Unladen weight, max. | 24.0 t 23.6 long tons; 26.5 short tons | 22.5 t 22.1 long tons; 24.8 short tons |

=== S: Special flat wagons with bogies ===
Special flat wagons with bogies

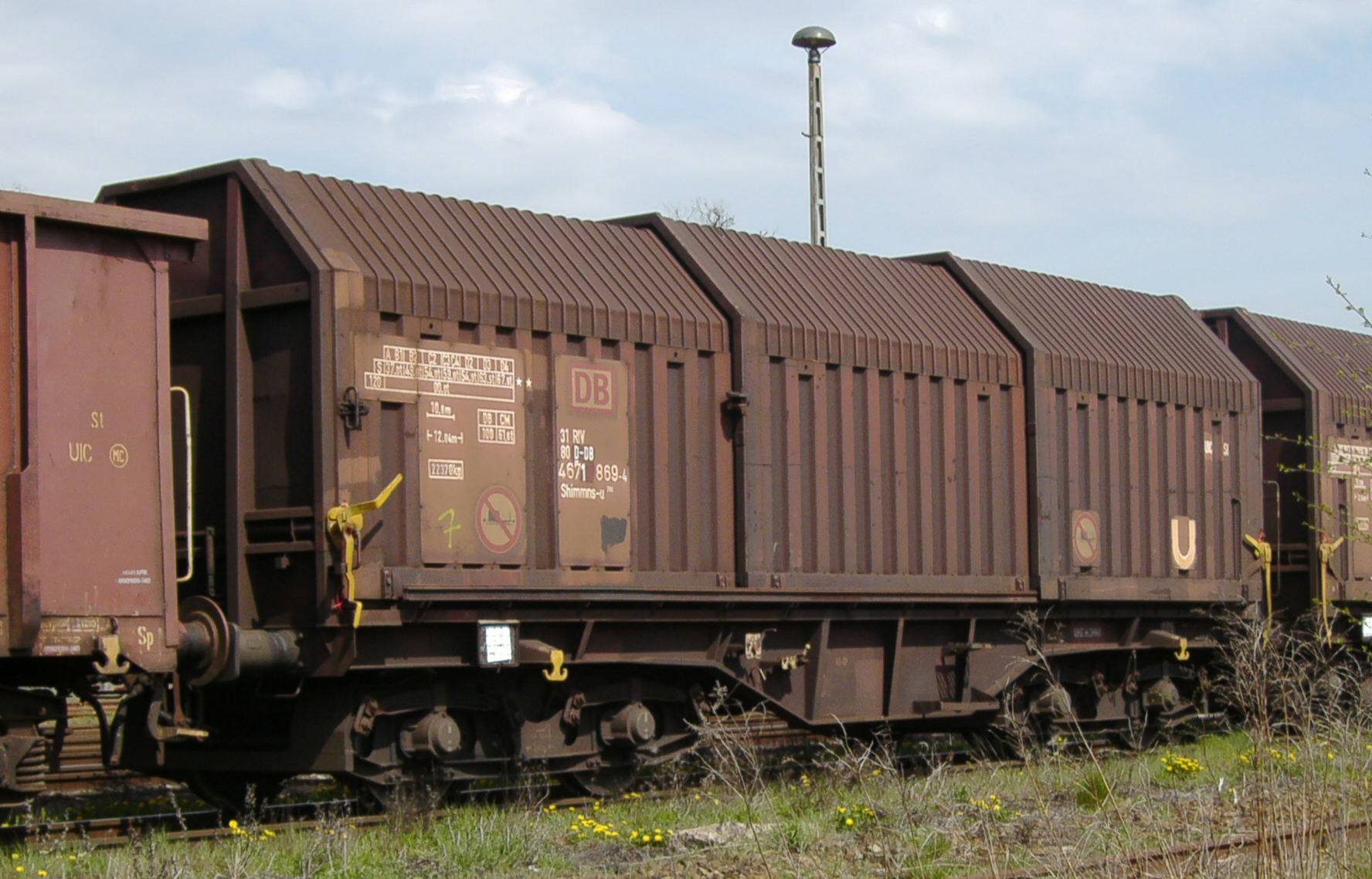
Four-axle UIC standard wagon for coil transport (Shimmns-u^{708} owned by DB)

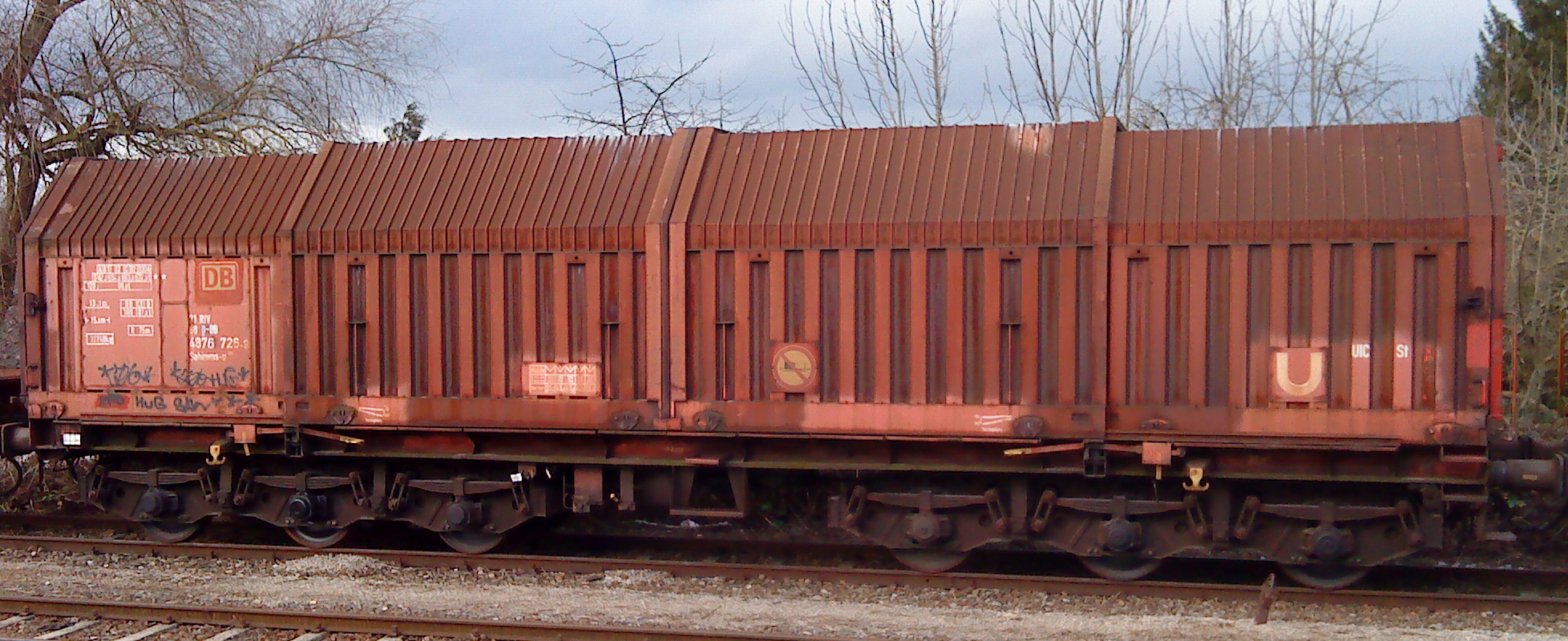
Six-axle UIC standard wagon for coil transport (Sahimmns-u^{900} owned by DB)

This is the largest group of flat wagons both in terms of variety and numbers. Their classification as special wagons arises either as a result of not having a wagon deck that is drivable or due to their axle count. Unlike the standard wagons, these flats are predominantly optimised for a specific purpose. In 1998 the DB had about 22,000 Class S wagons in its fleet.

The large variety of variants may be seen from the number of index letters, of which only the most important are given here; i.e. those that are needed to distinguish the basic types:

- a – 6 axles,
- aa – 8 or more axles,
- d – fitted out for the transport of motor cars,
- g – fitted for the transport of containers (Container wagons),
- gg – fitted for the transport of containers, total loading length over 60 ft (18.29 m),
- h – for the transport of steel coils, eye to side
- i – with removable cover and non-removable ends,
- l – without stanchions (optional in certain combinations),
- mm – very short loading length (four-axle wagons < 15 m or 49 ft 2 1/2 in, otherwise < 18 m or 59 ft 5/8 in),
- p – without sides (the use of this code letter is optional in certain combinations),
- r – articulated wagon, three bogies.

==== S wagons for heavy loads ====
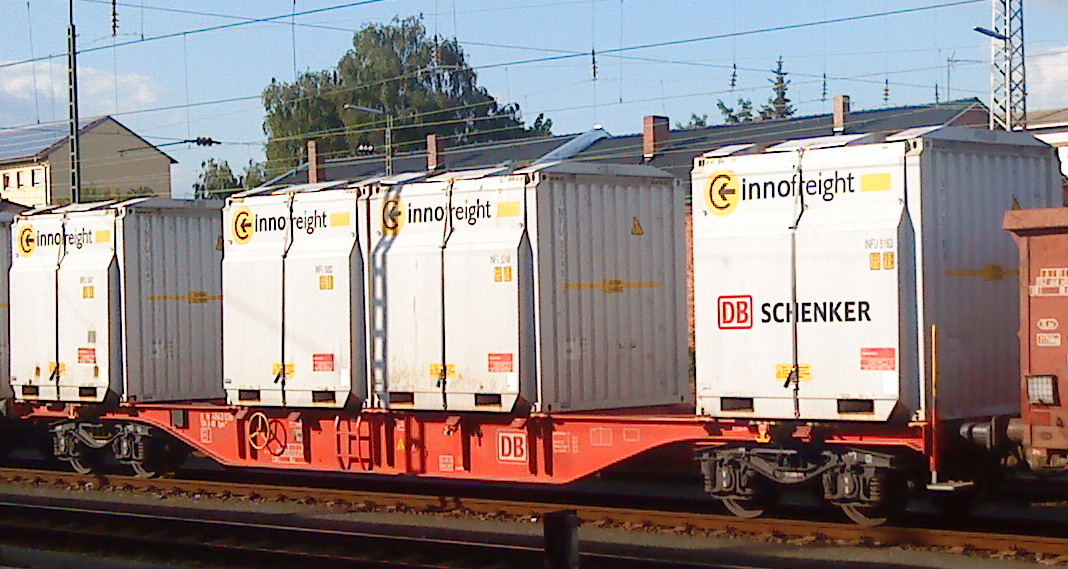
Four-axle transporter for ISO containers (Sgns^{481} with the DB)

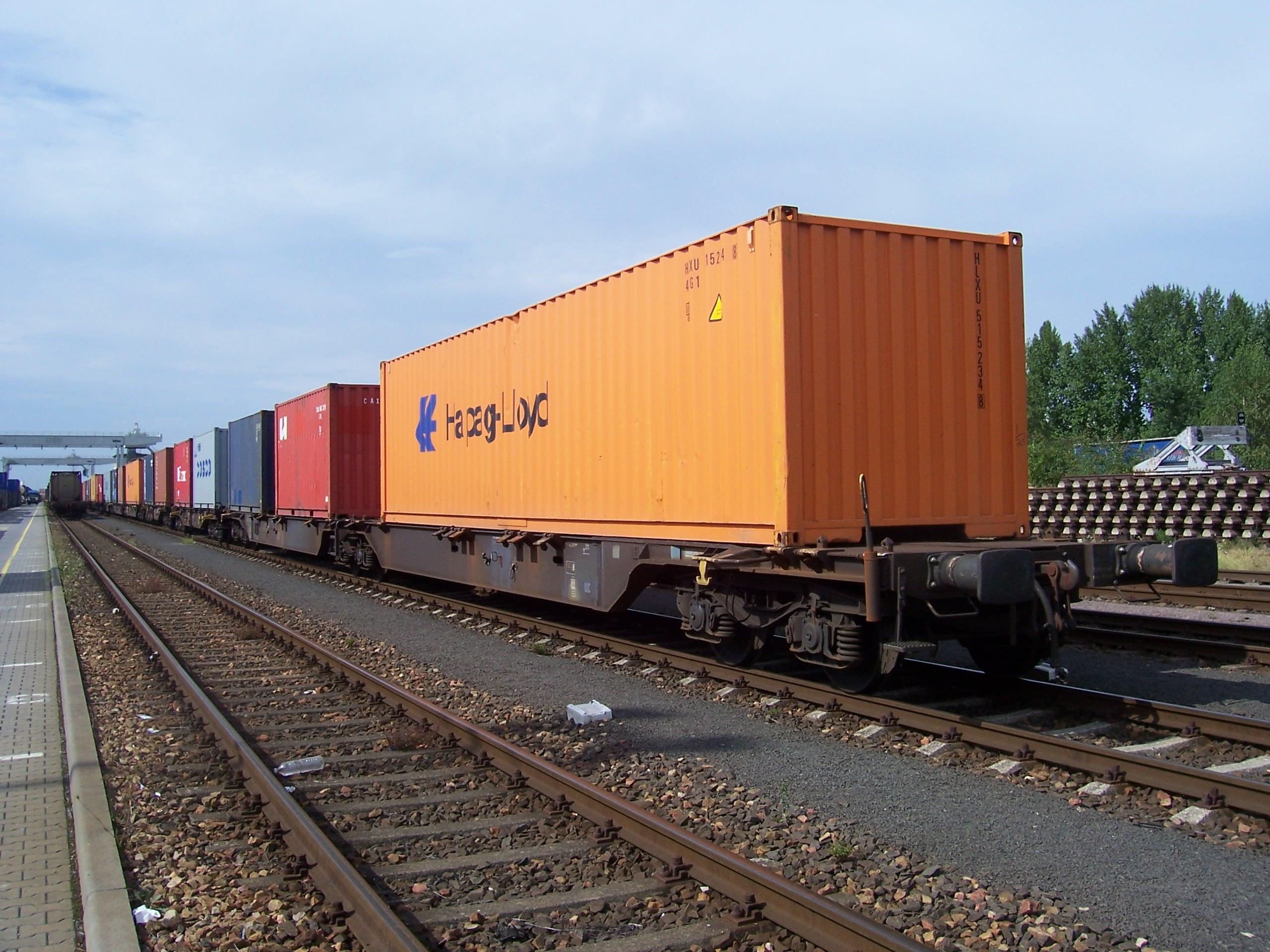
Six-axle (three bogie) transporter for ISO containers (articulated wagon)

These wagons are so designed that the loading is limited only by the class of railway line, not the wagon itself. In order to keep the sag as low as possible, they are relatively short and thus mainly inscribed with the index letters mm.

The six-axle wagons with drivable decks of class Samm… are similar to the four-axle Rmm wagons, but are grouped with this special class due to the number of axles. In the Deutsche Bahn, these mainly consist of RRym wagons with a 90-tonne (89-long-ton; 99-short-ton) payload.

In considerably larger numbers, and designed for transporting steel coils, are the four and six-axle wagons equipped with loading troughs of the class S…hmm…. Some have fixed end walls and removable covers in the shape of tarpaulins or telescopic hoods. The Shimmns^{708} serving with the DB, which is the most common German S wagon, has an unladen weight of about 23 t (23 long tons; 25 short tons) and a loading limit of 67 t (66 long tons; 74 short tons) and is thus able to carry coils with a total weight of about 45 t (44 long tons; 50 short tons).

The UIC has standardized a four and a six-axle telescopic hood wagon for the transport of coils. Such wagons have been used in Germany since the 1970s and 1980s respectively, but usually fitted with (light) tarpaulins instead of the hoods:

| | UIC 571-3: Goods wagons of special type | |
| Wagon type | Type 1 − four-axle | Type 2 − six-axle |
| Class | Shimms to 1979: Shis | Sahimms to 1979: Sahis |
|---|---|---|
| Pivot pitch | 7.00 m 22 ft 11 5/8 in | 8.00 m 26 ft 3 in |
| Length over buffers | 12.04 m 39 ft 6 in | 15.00 m 49 ft 2 1/2 in |
| Loading length, min. | 10.80 m 35 ft 5 1/4 in | 13.76 m 45 ft 1 3/4 in |
| Unladen weight, max. | 22.0 t 21.7 long tons; 24.3 short tons | 34.0 t 33.5 long tons; 37.5 short tons |

==== S wagons for combined transport ====
The group known as wagons for combined transport have specific designs and equipment for the transport of the various transport units. The UIC has standardized several wagons, whose most important dimensions are given in the following table:

| | UIC 571-4: Goods wagons for combined transport | | | | | | | |
| Wagon type | Container wagon | | | | | Flat wagons for piggyback services | | |
| Class | Type 1 with four axles, short | | Type 2 with four axles, long | | Type 4 with six axles | Type 1 Pocket wagon | Type 2 Kangourou wagon | Type 3 Wippenwagen |
| Class | Sg[kk]mmss | Sgjkkmmss | Sgss | Sgjss | Saggrss | Skss since 1980: Sdkms | Skss | Saass |
|---|---|---|---|---|---|---|---|---|
| Pivot pitch | 10.75 m 35 ft 3 1/4 in | 11.30 m 37 ft 7/8 in | 14.60 m 47 ft 10 3/4 in | 15.80 m 51 ft 10 in | 10.70 m 35 ft 1 1/4 in | 11.20 m 36 ft 9 in | 11.00 m 36 ft 1 1/8 in | 11.60 m 38 ft 3/4 in |
| Length over buffers | 15.79 m 51 ft 9 5/8 in | 16.94 m 55 ft 6 7/8 in | 19.64 m 64 ft 5 1/4 in | 21.00 m 68 ft 10 3/4 in | 27.10 m 88 ft 10 7/8 in | 16.44 m 53 ft 11 1/4 in | 16.24 m 53 ft 3 3/8 in | 31.87 m 104 ft 6 3/4 in |
| Loading length, min. | 14.50 m 47 ft 6 7/8 in | 14.60 m 47 ft 10 3/4 in | 18.40 m 60 ft 4 3/8 in | | 2 × 12.27 m 40 ft 3 1/8 in | − | − | − |

===== Flat wagons for ISO containers and swap bodies =====
These wagons of Class Sg… are most common in combined transport. Their foldable trunnions (klappbare Tragzapfen) make them suitable for various transport systems. Some of these rail vehicles are equipped with long-stroke shock absorbers (index letter j) as special equipment for the protection of loads.

- Wagons with a loading length of at least 18.40 m (60 ft 4 3/8 in) (Type 2 conforming to UIC norm 571-4) can carry ISO containers with a total length of 60 feet (18.29 m); the majority can also be used for the transport of swap bodies. The Deutsche Bundesbahn expanded its fleet in 2007 by 615 wagons of Class Sgns (delivered by March 2009) with the option for a further 600 wagons (delivery by 2010).
- On transporter wagons with a loading length of at least 14.50 m (47 ft 6 7/8 in) (Type 1 conforming to UIC norm 571-4) there are an A swap body, up to two C swap bodies or an ISO container with a corresponding total length place.
- For the transport of High Cube swap bodies and ISO containers with an inside height of 3 m (9 ft 10 1/8 in) wagons with especially low-lying loading areas and a loading length of 15.89 m (52 ft 1 5/8 in) have also been available since the 1990s.
- Two-part articulated wagons with 2 m × 16.10 m (6 ft 6 3/4 in × 52 ft 9 7/8 in) loading length can be loaded with swap bodies or ISO containers with a total length of 80 feet (24.38 m) (index letters gg and r).

The use of Kangourou wagon and Wippenwagen remained restricted in the period from the 1960s to the 1980s, despite their utility in enabling horizontal cross-loading without cranes, because at that time facilities for swap body cross-loading were still widely available in western Europe.

The CargoSprinter, conceived as a goods wagon for the transport of ISO containers, did not get any further than trials.

===== ACTS wagons =====
These wagons for the ACTS roller container transport system with horizontal crossloading are common especially in Switzerland and the Netherlands. The Swiss wagons bear the national index letter x.

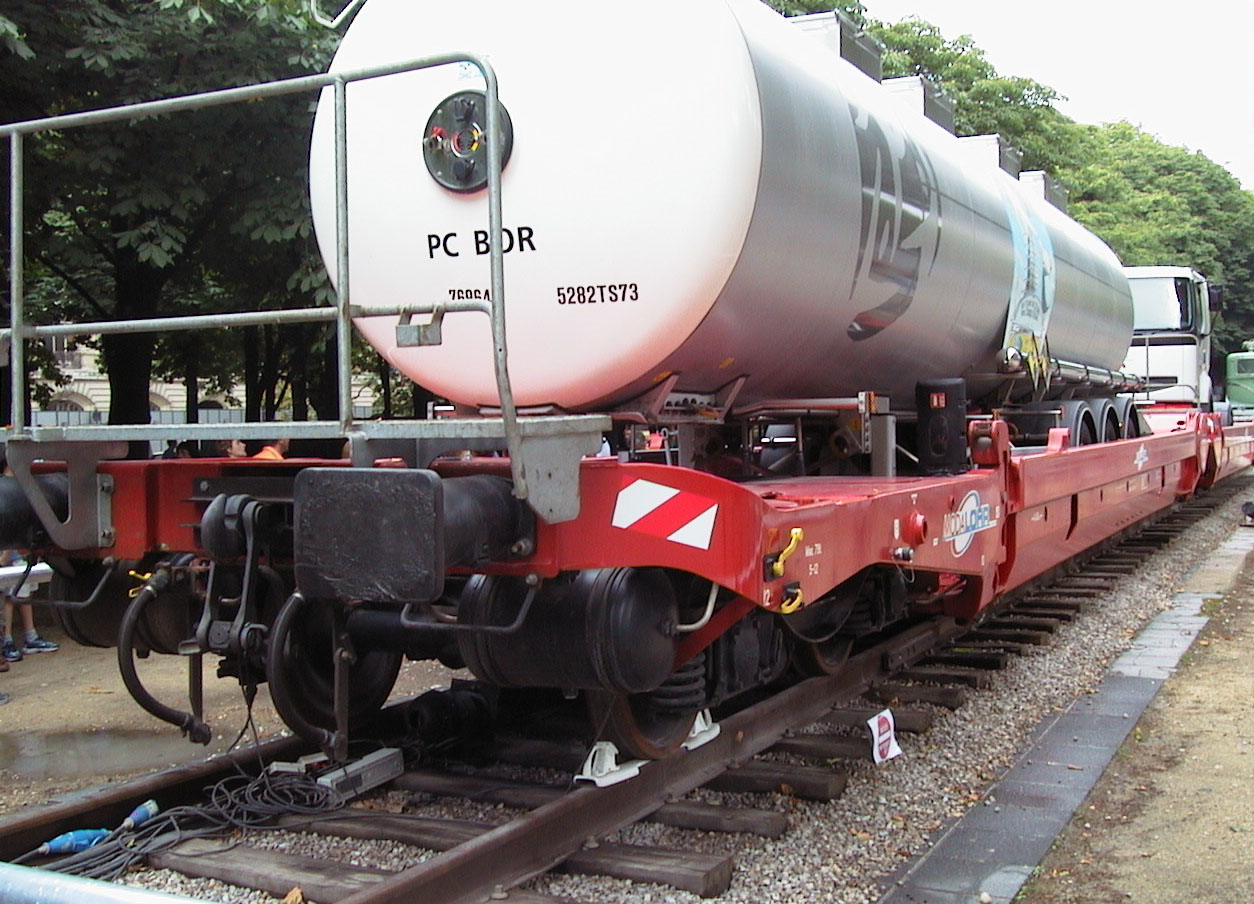
Four axle Modalohr wagon

===== Flat wagons for road vehicles =====
Flat wagons for road vehicles (Class S…d…) are less common, because this typ of combined transport is only efficient on certain routes.

- Pocket wagons (Class Sd[g]…) are used specifically for the transport of semi-trailers. They may usually however be loaded either with ISO containers or swap bodies as required, thus avoiding empty running.
- Low floor wagons for the rolling road (Class Saad…) are suitable for loading entire articulated lorries including their tractor units. The necessary low floors required are achieved by using especially small wheel diameters in each of the four-axle bogies. These make the wagons relatively expensive to build and maintain.
- CargoBeamer: This newly developed type of waggon (TSI conformity since 8/2010) enable the transport of semi-trailers, loading of which is automated by a tub (Wanne) and pulled parallel onto the railway wagon.
- Kangourou wagons are used specifically for the transport of semi-trailers.
- Modalohr is used for specifically for the transport of Semi-trailer trucks

==== S wagons for special purposes ====
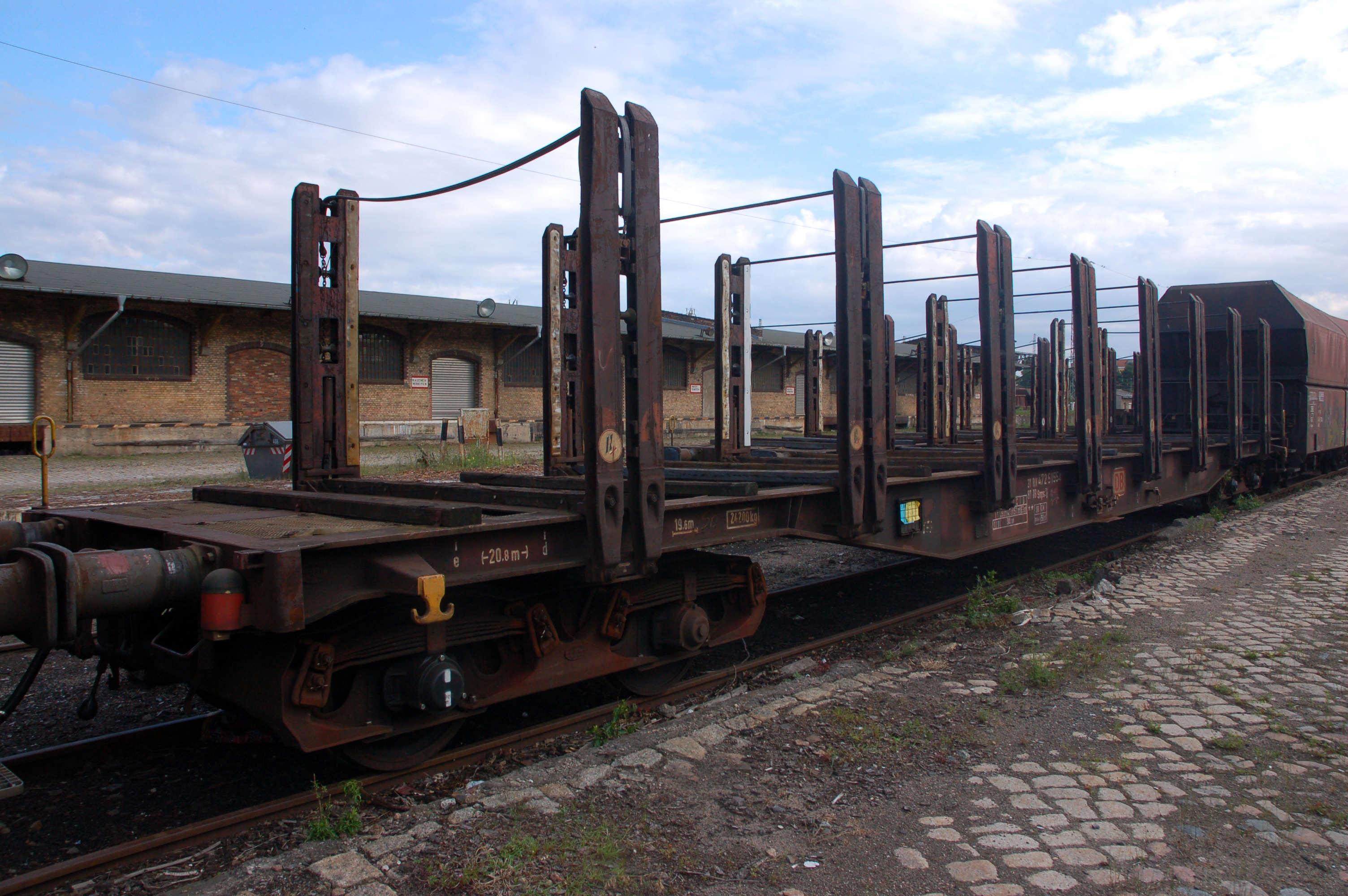
Special wagon with strong double stanchions for timber haulage (Snps^{719} owned by DB)

For the transport of logs, four-axle wagons with non-drivable decks and equipped with high, fixed stanchions are used (Class Snps).

Wagons with a flat deck for transporting assembled track sections, some of which are fitted with special equipment and used in maintenance of way trains, are usually classified as departmental wagons.

Under some circumstances bucket wagons (Kübelwagen) are not classified as open wagons, but grouped into Class S.

The group known as Spreizhaubenwagen (Sins, Sfins) are related to the Sliding wall wagons and, like them are for hygroscopic goods, but have no fixed roof. The sliding walls taper inwards towards the top and are connected by an articulated joint so the walls can be spread and slid apart, so that one half of the wagon is entirely open and may be loaded or unloaded from the side by forklift truck or from above by crane.

=== Flat wagons for specific purposes that are grouped under several classes ===
==== Container wagons ====
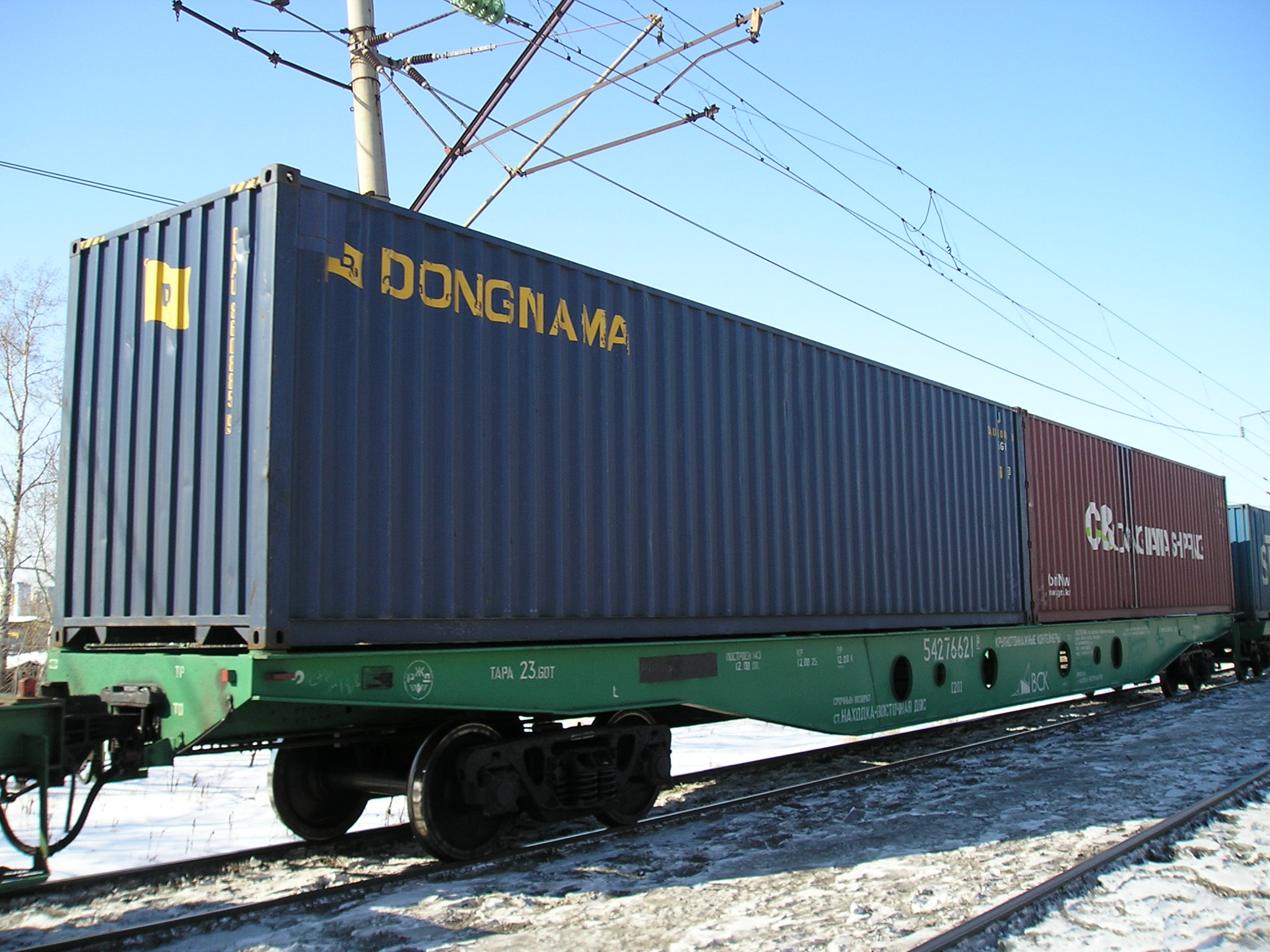
80-foot flatcar holding two 40-foot ISO containers

Container wagons are flats specially fitted with securing equipment for transporting ISO containers. Depending on their design they may be grouped into classes L, R or S. Class K wagons are rarely used because even an 8-foot (2.438 m) high ISO container exceeds the European loading gauge. The presence of container pins is always indicated by the index letter g. Only general purpose wagons that have to be specially prepared for container transport and have a drivable floor, are classed as standard wagons. Wagons that are exclusively used for container transport are classified as special types. In the latter case, the profile of the wagon underframe is left open and the container only rests on the beams and the trunnions.

Most container flats are designed to take standard 20 and 40 foot ISO containers. Two-axle wagons of this type are able to carry two 20-foot or one 40-foot container; many four-axle wagons have room for three 20-foot or one 40-foot and one 20-foot container.

In India double stacking of containers is done on flat wagons instead of well cars under 7.5m high catenary because the wider Indian Gauge permits more height while keeping the centre of gravity still low.

==== Car transporters ====
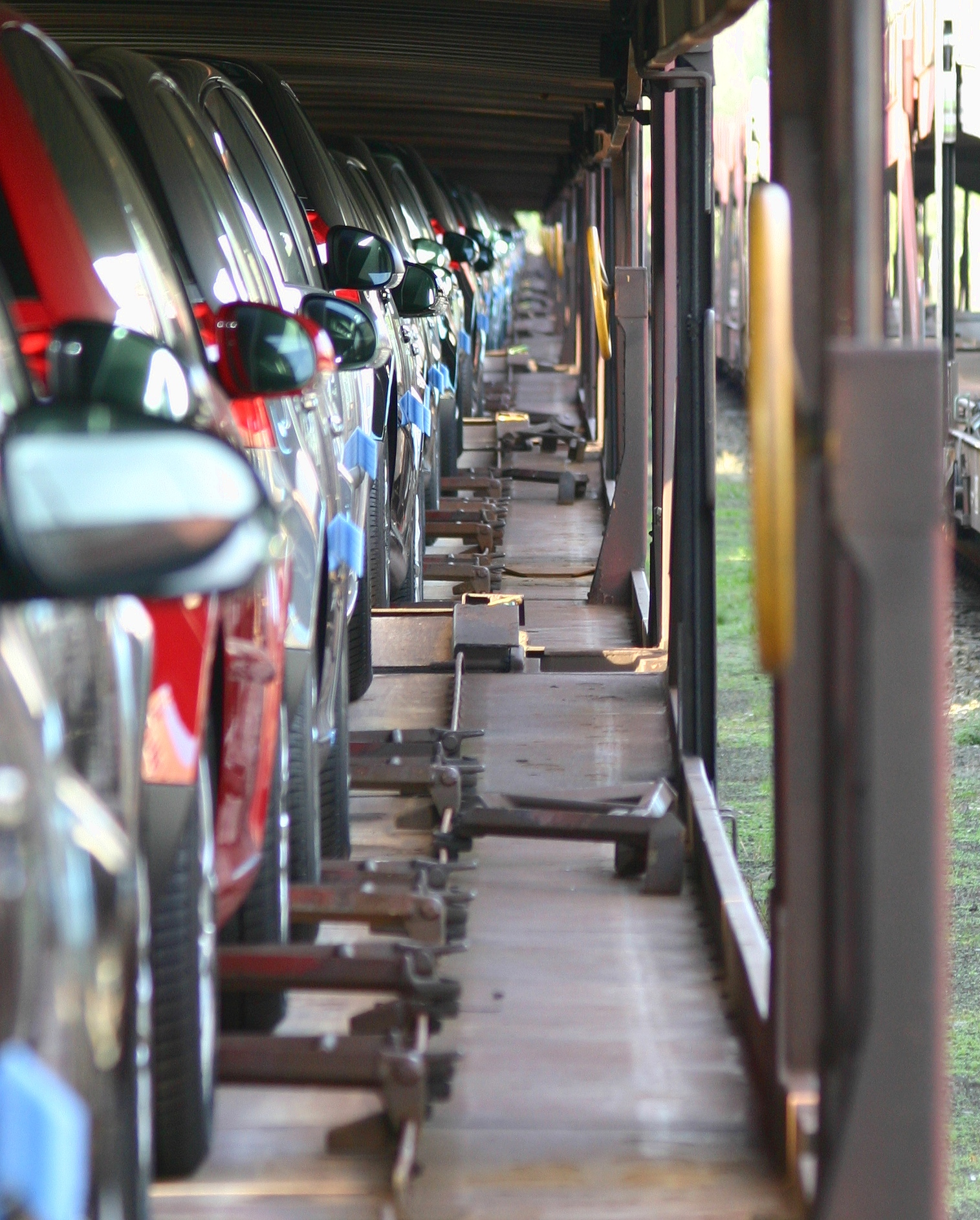
Cars transported on flats with chocks fixing the wheels

Car transporters (US: autoracks) are predominantly used for the delivery of factory-new cars and vans to dealers.

Because cars are a relatively light form of freight, European car transporters have two decks and, despite their great length, only need at most three axles. Where there are three axles, the centre one rests on a swivel and the wagon has an articulated joint in the middle. The cars can be loaded over the joint. These wagons are open as a rule and are thus classified as flat wagons of Class L (see above).

Before the development of these specials, standard open wagons were fitted with a second deck, the end walls were removed and pairs of wagons were permanently coupled in order to be used as car transporters. In Germany in the 1950s their capacity proved no longer sufficient for the transport of the VW Beetle. As a result, engineers at Volkswagen and Deutsche Bundesbahn jointly designed an extra long wagon for the transport of factory-new vehicles. The result was a wagon that could carry ten cars from the factory to the ports for export from 1958 onwards.

The car-carrier wagons used in motorail trains are not classed as goods wagons despite their similar design.

== See also ==
- Barrier vehicle
- Bogie bolster wagon
- Class U special wagon
- Conflat
- Flatcar
- Flatbed trolley
- Flatbed truck
- Goods wagon
- Rolling highway
- Side stake
- Slate waggon
- Tie down strap
- Transporter flatcar

== Literature and sources ==
- H. Behrends: Güterwagen-Archiv Band 1. Transpress VEB Verlag für Verkehrswesen, Berlin, 1989.
- H. Behrends: Güterwagen-Archiv Band 2. Transpress VEB Verlag für Verkehrswesen, Berlin, 1989.
- Deutsche Bundesbahn: Güterwagen, Großbehälter, Straßenroller. Werbe- and Auskunftsamt für den Personen- and Güterverkehr, Frankfurt(Main), 1960.
- Gerd Wolff: Die Autotransportwagen. Güterwagen-Lexikon DB, EK-Verlag Freiburg, 1991 and 2005. ISBN 3-88255-654-4
- Stefan Carstens: Die Güterwagen der DB AG – Zahlen, Fakten, Entwicklungen.. MIBA-Verlang, Nuremberg, 1998
- Stefan Carstens: Güterwagen Band 5. Rungen-, Schienen- and Flat wagons. MIBA-Verlag, Nuremberg, 2008
- Wolfgang Diener: Anstrich and Bezeichnung von Güterwagen. Verlag Dr. Bernhard Abend, Stuttgart, 1992
