= Hoodwink =

Hoodwink, Hoodwinked, or Hoodwinkers may refer to:

== Films ==
- Hoodwink (1981 film), 1981 Australian film
- Hoodwinked!, 2005 American animated mystery/fantasy film
  - Hoodwinked! (soundtrack), from the film
- Hoodwinked Too! Hood vs. Evil, 2011 sequel to the 2005/'06 film

== Other ==
- Hoodwink (comics), fictional character in the Marvel Comics universe
- Hoodwink Island, adjacent to Antarctica
- The Hoodwinkers, 13th book in the Romney Marsh series of novels by Monica Edwards, published in 1962

== See also ==
- Hood (disambiguation)
- Wink (disambiguation)
