= Hoodlum (disambiguation) =

A hoodlum is a thug, usually in a group of misfits who are associated with crime or theft.

Hoodlum may also refer to:

- The Hoodlum (1919 film), starring Mary Pickford
- The Hoodlum (1951 film), an American film directed by Max Nosseck
- Hoodlum (film), a 1997 film starring Laurence Fishburne
  - Hoodlum (soundtrack)
- "Hoodlum" (song), a 1997 song by Mobb Deep
- NATO codename for the Russian/Soviet Kamov Ka-26 utility helicopter
- Enemies in the video game Rayman 3: Hoodlum Havoc
