= Southampton-class frigate =

Class overview
- Name: Southampton-class frigate
- Built: 1756–1759
- In commission: 1757–1812
- Completed: 4
- Lost: 1

General characteristics
- Tons burthen: 652 51/94 bm (as designed)
- Length: 124 ft 4 in (38 m)
- Beam: 34 ft 8 in (11 m)
- Depth of hold: 12 ft (4 m)
- Sail plan: Full-rigged ship
- Complement: 210
- Armament: Upperdeck: 26 × 12-pounder guns; Quarterdeck: 4 × 6-pounder guns; Forecastle: 2 × 6-pounder guns

The Southampton-class frigates were 32-gun sailing frigates of the fifth rate produced for the Royal Navy. They were designed in 1756 by Sir Thomas Slade, and were the first 'true' fifth-rate frigates produced to the new single-deck concept (that is, without any gunports on the lower deck). They were, however, designed with sweep ports (for rowing) along the lower deck.

Unlike the contemporary sixth-rate frigates of 28 guns, which were derived from French designs by Slade, the Southampton class were fully British-designed. Unlike the French models, these ships had considerably more height on the lower deck, and were originally intended to work their cables here.

A total of four ships were built in oak during the Seven Years' War, all ordered from private shipyards. The initial design was approved on 12 March 1756, and provided for a ship of 648 37/94 tons burthen, and the contract with Robert Inwood to build the prototype reflected this. On 25 May the design was modified by Slade to lengthen the ship on the lower deck by 3 inches, and along the keel by 10½ inches, thus raising the tonnage to 652 51/94 burthen; on the same date, the name Southampton was approved for the prototype, and two further ships were ordered to be built to this design, with a fourth vessel being ordered one week later.

== Ships in class ==
- Southampton
  - Ordered: 12 March 1756
  - Built by: Robert Inwood, Rotherhithe.
  - Keel laid: April 1756
  - Launched: 5 May 1757
  - Completed: 19 June 1757 at Deptford Dockyard.
  - Fate: Wrecked in the Bahamas on 27 November 1812.
- Minerva
  - Ordered: 25 May 1756
  - Built by: John Quallet, Rotherhithe.
  - Keel laid: 1 June 1756
  - Launched: 17 January 1759
  - Completed: 3 March 1759 at Deptford Dockyard.
  - Fate: Captured by the French on 22 August 1778. Retaken on 4 January 1781 and renamed Recovery 20 April 1781. Sold at Deptford Dockyard 30 December 1784.
- Vestal
  - Ordered: 25 May 1756
  - Built by: John Barnard & John Turner, Harwich.
  - Keel laid: June 1756
  - Launched: 17 June 1757
  - Completed: 17 August 1757 at the builder's shipyard.
  - Fate: Taken to pieces at Deptford Dockyard in June 1775.
- Diana
  - Ordered: 1 June 1756
  - Built by: Robert Batson, Limehouse.
  - Keel laid: June 1756
  - Launched: 30 August 1757
  - Completed: 12 September 1757 at Deptford Dockyard.
  - Fate: Sold at Deptford Dockyard on 16 May 1793.
