= Francis Grosvenor Hood =

British Army officer (1809–1854)

The Honourable Francis Grosvenor Hood
- Born: 4 March 1809
- Died: 18 October 1855 (aged 46)
- Military career
- Allegiance: United Kingdom
- Service: British Army: Grenadier Guards
- Service years: 1827–1855
- Rank: Lieutenant-colonel
- Conflicts: Crimean War; Battle of the Alma; Siege of Sebastopol †

The Hon. (Note: This gentleman and his sister obtained, by royal licence, the precedence of a viscount's younger children.) Francis Grosvenor Hood (1809–1855) was an English army officer in the British Army, rising to the rank of lieutenant-colonel of the Grenadier Guards. He led, as major, the 3rd Battalion of Grenadiers at the Battle of the Alma in 1854. He was killed in the trenches before Sebastopol in 1855.

== Origins ==
Francis Grosvenor Hood, born on 4 March 1809, was the second son of Lieutenant-colonel Francis Wheler Hood, son of Henry, 2nd Viscount Hood, and grandson of Samuel, 1st Viscount. His mother was Caroline (died 11 March 1858), only daughter of Sir Andrew Snape Hamond. His father was killed when in his thirty-third year, on the heights of Aire, on 2 March 1814, and was, in the words of Wellington, "an officer of great promise and merit".

== Career ==
Francis joined the Grenadier Guards in 1827, was promoted to his lieutenancy and captaincy in 1830, became captain and lieutenant-colonel on 31 December 1841, and on 27 June 1854 was gazetted major of the 3rd Battalion of the Grenadiers.

Hood proceeded with the 3rd Battalion to the Crimea, and led it at the Battle of the Alma on 20 September 1854, when his conspicuous gallantry and judgment contributed most effectively to the defeat of the Russian counter-attack, and he received the special thanks of the commander-in-chief.

On 18 October 1855 Hood was in command of the covering party guarding the trenches and guns before Sebastopol, and was shot dead while taking an observation. Prince Edward of Saxe-Weimar, a fellow officer of the Grenadier Guards, wrote of his commander, "He was looking out of an embrasure when a round-shot caught him in the side. He died almost immediately—died as a soldier, as did his father before him. He is a very great loss to us." Lord Raglan, in his despatch of 23 October, described Hood as an excellent officer, and wrote that he was "deeply lamented".

== Personal life ==
Hood married in 1842 his first cousin, Elizabeth Jane, second daughter of Sir Graham Eden Hamond, but had no issue.

== Gallery ==
Sketch of the Battle of Alma, 20 Sep. 1854.

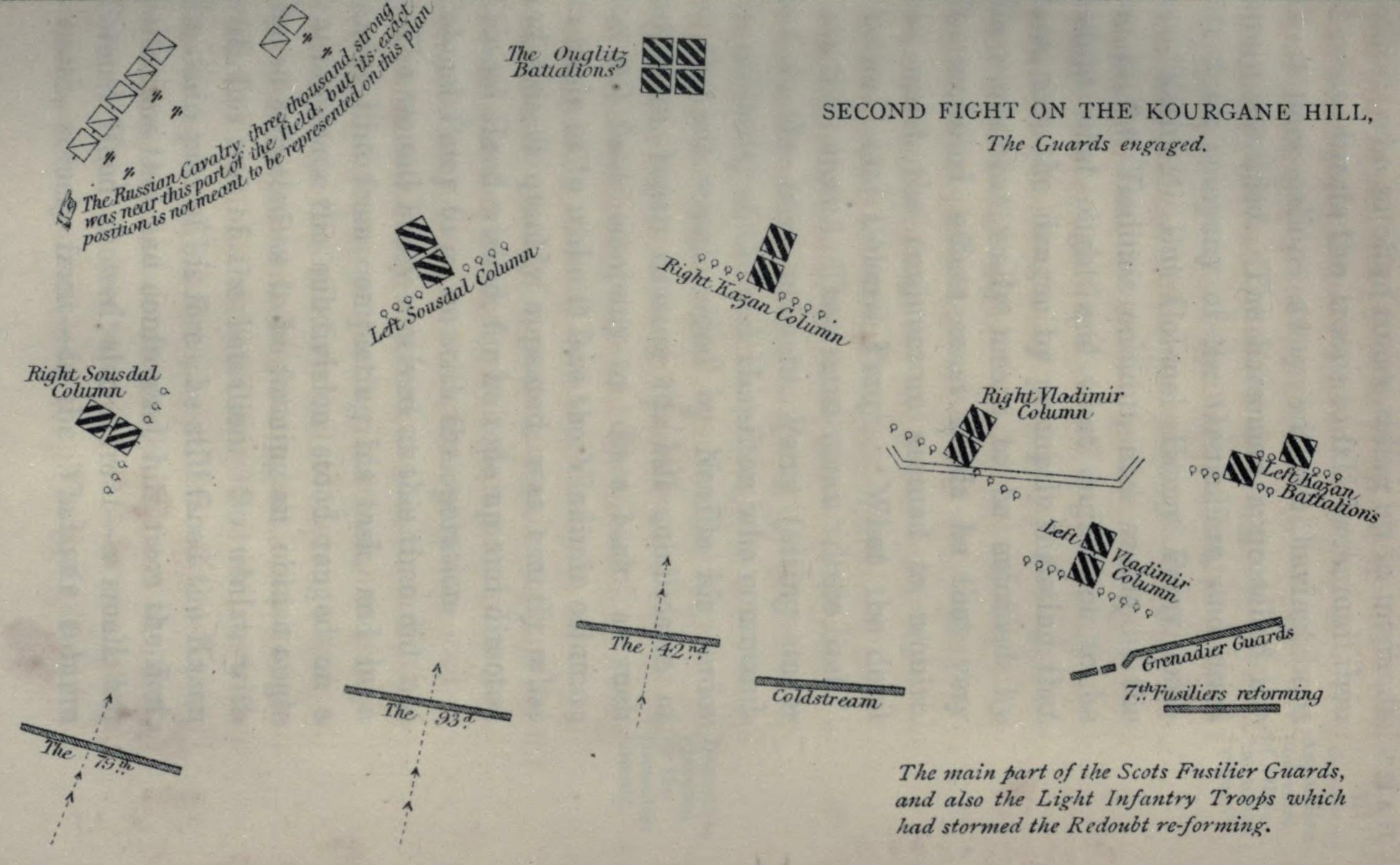
Second fight on the Kourgane Hill at the Alma. The Guards engaged.

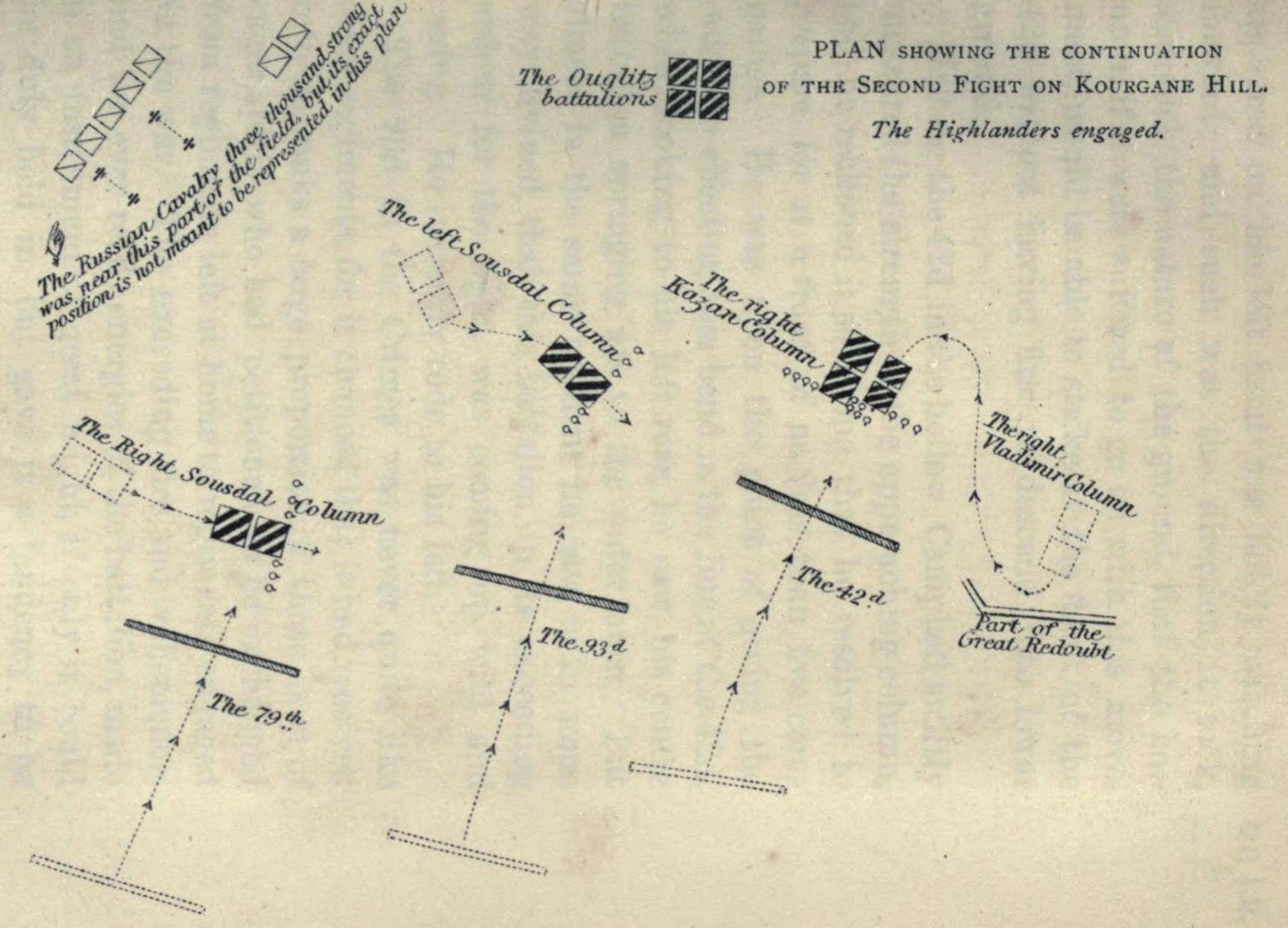
Continuation of the second fight on the Kourgane Hill. The Highlanders engaged.

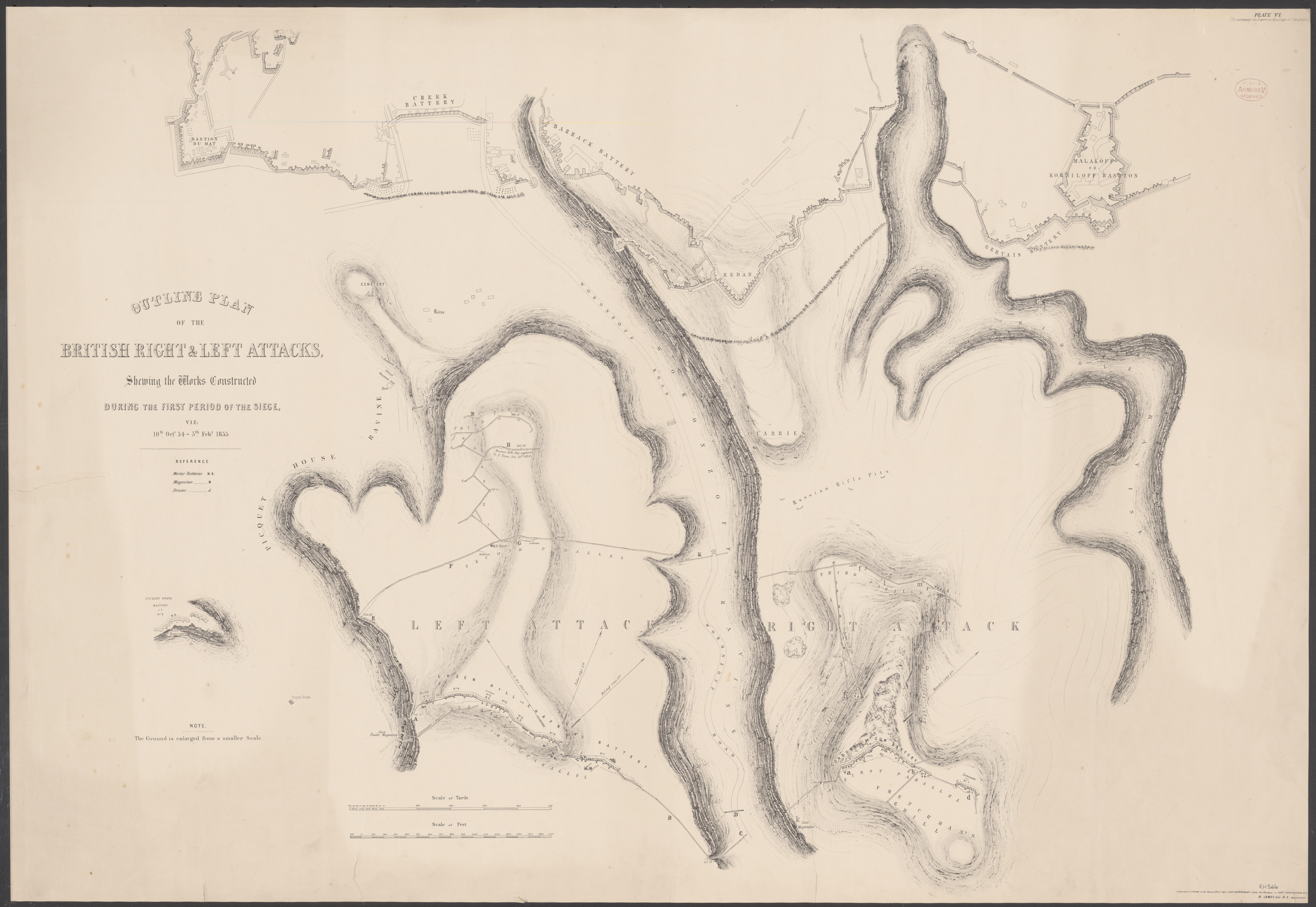
British attacks at Sebastopol, showing the works constructed, 10 Oct. 1854–5 Feb. 1855.

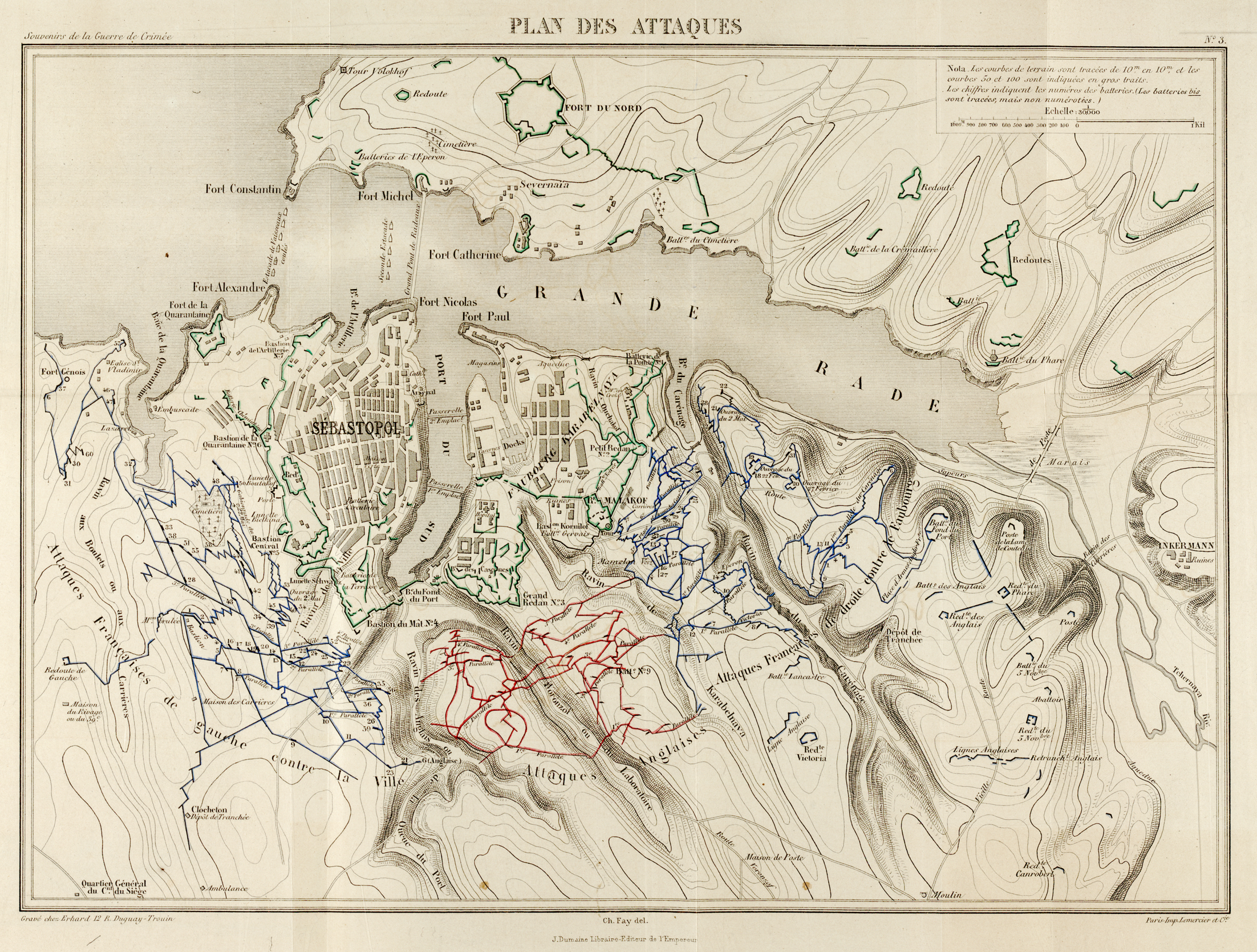
Map of the French (blue) and English (red) positions at Sebastopol, 1855.

== Sources ==
- [Anon.]; Falkner, James (2004). "Hood, Francis Grosvenor (1809–1854), army officer". Oxford Dictionary of National Biography (online ed.). Oxford University Press. doi:10.1093/ref:odnb/13674. (Subscription, Wikipedia Library access or UK public library membership required.)
- Burke, Bernard (1865). A Genealogical and Heraldic Dictionary of the Peerage and Baronetage of the British Empire. 27th ed. London: Harrison. p. 587.
- Gurwood, John, ed. (1834). The Dispatches of Field Marshal the Duke of Wellington. Vol. 11. London: John Murray. p. 548.
- Kinglake, A. W. (1877). The Invasion of the Crimea. 6th ed. Vol. 3. Edinburgh and London: William Blackwood and Sons. pp. 220–222, 239.
- Kinglake, A. W. (1877). The Invasion of the Crimea. 6th ed. Vol. 4. Edinburgh and London: William Blackwood and Sons. p. 442.
- The Gentleman's Magazine. Vol. 84, Part 1. January–June 1814. London: Nichols, Son, and Bentley. pp. 413, 492.
- The Gentleman's Magazine. Vol. 198, Part 1. January–June 1855. London: John Bowyer Nichols and Sons. pp. 83–84.

Attribution:

- This article incorporates text from a publication now in the public domain: Lee, Sidney, ed. (1891). "Hood, Francis Grosvenor". Dictionary of National Biography. Vol. 27. London: Smith, Elder & Co. pp. 257–258.
