= HMS Vestal (1757) =

Frigate of the Royal Navy

History

Great Britain
- Name: HMS Vestal
- Ordered: 25 May 1756
- Builder: John Barnard & John Turner, Harwich
- Laid down: June 1756
- Launched: 17 June 1757
- Completed: 17 August 1757
- Commissioned: April 1757
- Fate: Taken to pieces at Deptford, June 1775

General characteristics
- Class & type: Southampton-class fifth-rate frigate
- Tons burthen: 659 11/94 bm
- Length: 124 ft 4 in (37.90 m) (gundeck); 102 ft 1.5 in (31.13 m) (keel)
- Beam: 34 ft 10 in (10.62 m)
- Depth of hold: 12 ft 0 in (3.66 m)
- Sail plan: Full-rigged ship
- Complement: 210 officers and men
- Armament: 32 guns comprising: Upperdeck: 26 × 12-pounder guns; Quarterdeck: 4 × 6-pounder guns; Forecastle: 2 × 6-pounder guns

HMS Vestal was one of the four 32-gun Southampton-class fifth-rate frigates of the Royal Navy. She was built at King's Yard in Harwich by John Barnard and launched in 1757. She was broken up in 1775.

== Service history ==
During the Seven Years' War, on 21 February 1759, Vestal, under the command of Captain Samuel Hood, was part of a squadron under the command of Rear-Admiral Charles Holmes bound for North America. Vestal was in advance of the squadron when she sighted a sail ahead, and set off in pursuit. Vestal came up to the enemy ship, the 32-gun Bellone, at 2 p.m. After a fierce engagement lasting four hours, Bellone surrendered, having forty men killed, and being totally dismasted. Vestal had only her lower masts standing, and had five killed and twenty wounded. She returned to Spithead with her prize, which was bought into the Navy and renamed Repulse. The prize money for the capture of the Bellone was paid out at Portsmouth from May 1760.

In June 1759 Vestal was part of Rear-Admiral George Brydges Rodney's squadron, which bombarded Le Havre destroying flat-bottomed boats and supplies which had been collected there for a planned invasion of England.

On 16 March 1762 prize money was paid out at Leghorn to Vestal for the capture of the Marquis de Pille on 12 December 1760, the St. Antoine de L'Aigle on 19 January, the Marie Euphrosine on 17 April, and the St. Antoine de Padua on 17 June 1761, all in the Mediterranean.
