= Coil car =

Type of rolling stock

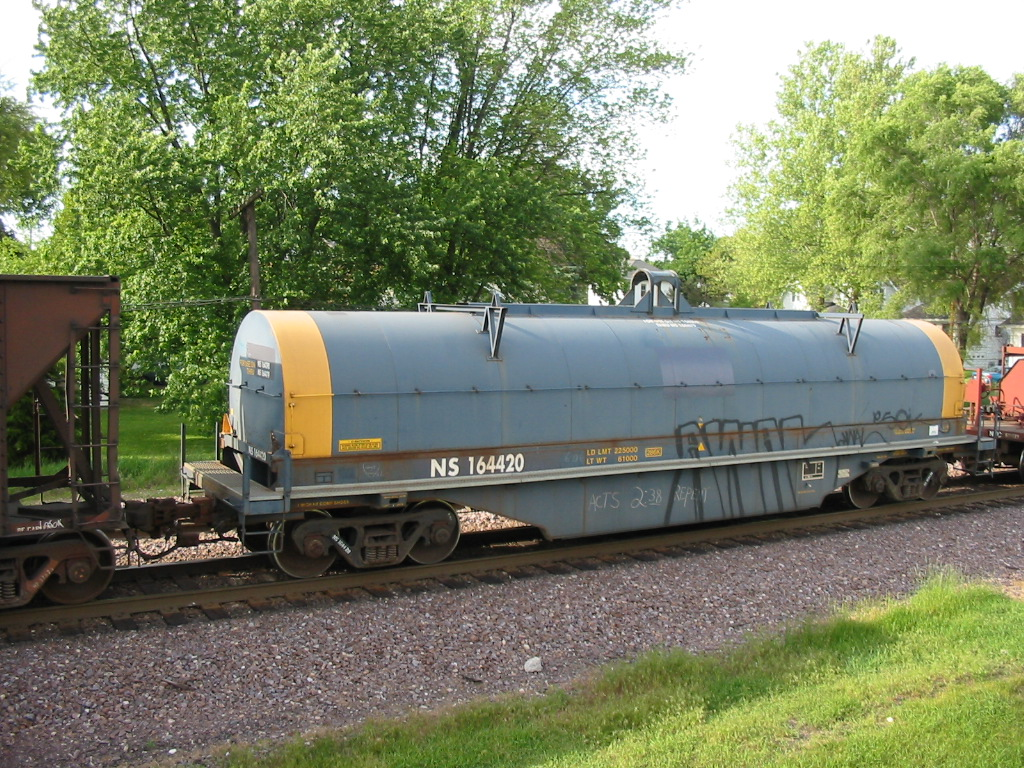
A coil car owned by Norfolk Southern Railway. The load is covered by a hood

Coil cars (also referred to as "steel coil cars" or "coil steel cars") are a specialized type of rolling stock designed for the transport of rolls of sheet metal (called "coils"), particularly steel. They are considered a subtype of the gondola car, though they bear little resemblance to a typical gondola.

== History ==
Prior to the invention of this type of coil car, coils of sheet metals were carried on-end or in cradles in open or covered gondolas. Load shifting, damage, and awkward loading and unloading were all problems, and since so much sheet metal is railroad-transported, a specialized car was designed for transporting coiled metals.

Cars manufactured specifically for coiled lading started to appear in the 1960s. Early examples include the Pennsylvania Railroad G40 and G41 class cars, built in 1964-65.

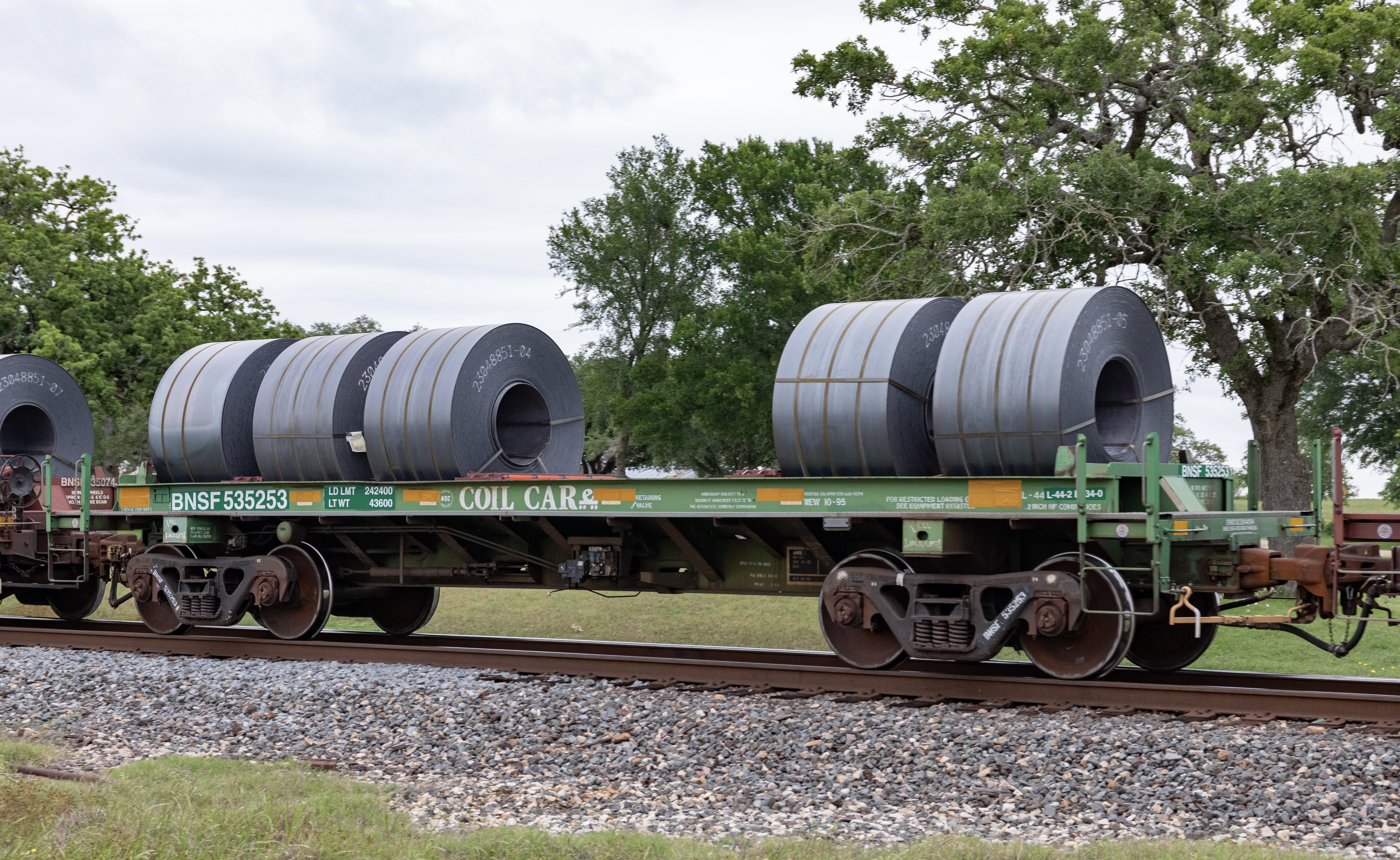
A coil car with the hood removed, revealing the load of steel coils inside

== Construction ==
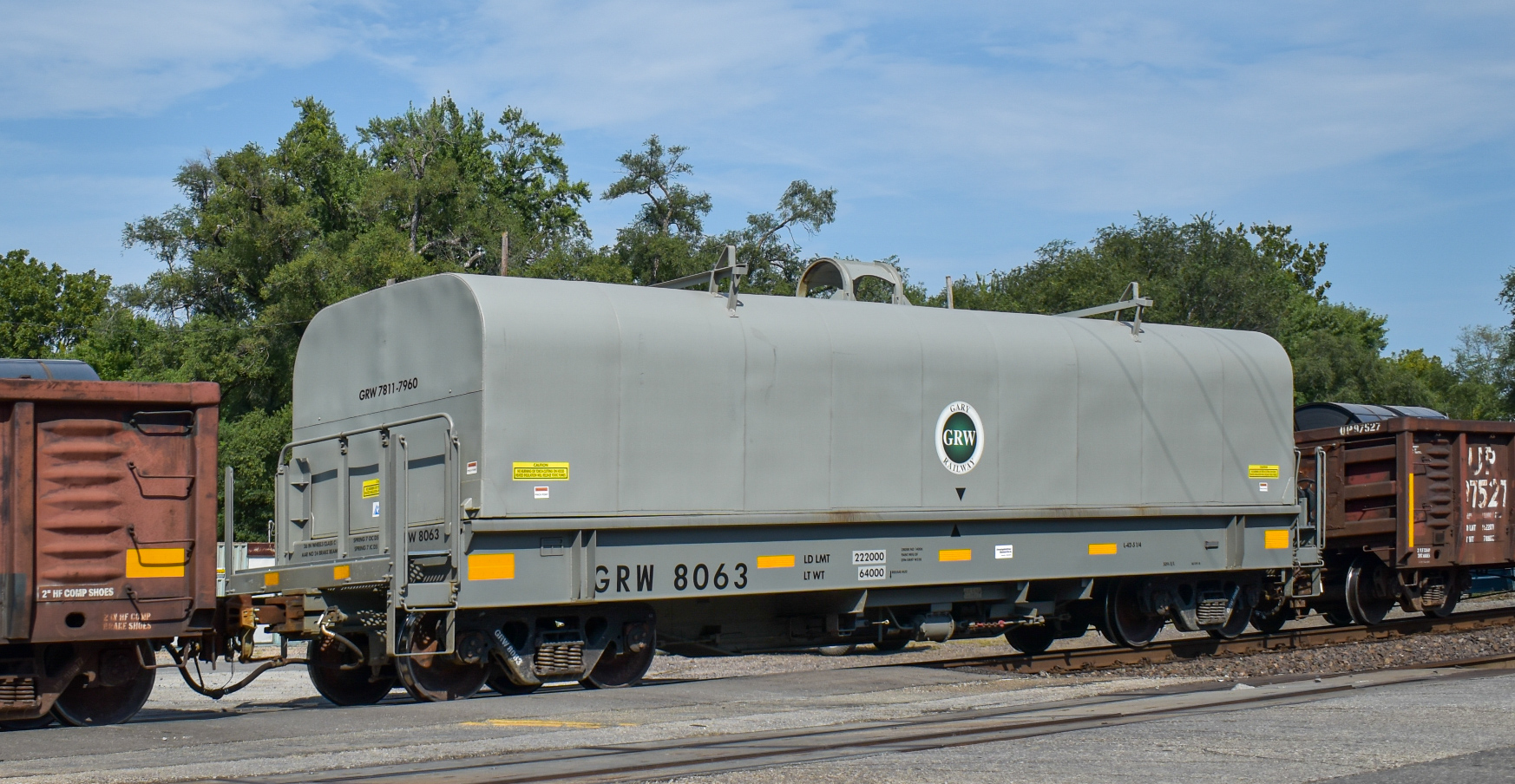
Modern covered coil car with a single interchangeable hood owned by Gary Railway

The body of a coil car consists of a trough or series of troughs. Most commonly these run lengthwise, but there are transverse variants as well; in either case, they are steel and may be lined with wood or other material to cushion the load. The coils are set on their sides in the trough with the core horizontal. Stops may be applied across the trough to keep the coils from shifting.

Some coil cars are open at the top, while others that carry commodities that can be damaged by the elements are equipped with hoods to cover the load. Covered cars use either a pair of hoods or, commonly, a single hood. Each hood has a lifting point at its center, and often has brackets on the top at the corners in order to allow the hoods to be stacked when not in use. The hoods are largely interchangeable, and it is common to see a car with mismatched hoods.

== See also ==
- Open wagon
- Wagon with opening roof
