= List of ships called HMS Hood =

Three ships of the Royal Navy have been named HMS Hood after several members of the Hood family, who were notable naval officers:

- HMS Hood (1859), a 91-gun second-rate ship of the line, originally laid down as HMS Edgar, but renamed in 1848 and launched in 1859. She was used for harbour service from 1872 and was sold in 1888.
- HMS Hood (1891), a modified Royal Sovereign-class battleship launched in 1891 and sunk as a blockship in 1914
- HMS Hood, an Admiral-class battlecruiser launched in 1918 and sunk in 1941 by the Bismarck and the heavy cruiser Prinz Eugen in the Battle of the Denmark Strait

== Battle honours ==
Ships named Hood have earned the following battle honours: (Note: In the Royal Navy, and other Commonwealth navies that follow the traditions of the RN, battle honours awarded to a ship are inherited by subsequent ships to bear the same name, and are displayed on the ship's honours board.)

- Bismarck, 1941
