= Admiral Hood =

Admiral Hood may refer to:

- Samuel Hood, 1st Viscount Hood (1724–1816), Royal Navy officer
- Alexander Hood, 1st Viscount Bridport (1726–1814), British Royal Navy officer
- Sir Samuel Hood, 1st Baronet (1762–1814), British Royal Navy officer
- Arthur Hood, 1st Baron Hood of Avalon (1824–1901), Royal Navy officer
- Horace Hood (1870–1916), Royal Navy admiral
- John Hood (naval officer) (1859–1919), US Navy officer
- Admiral Hood Monument, in Somerset, England
- HMS Hood, Royal Navy battlecruiser
