= Hood River =

Hood River may refer to:

== Rivers ==
- Hood River (Oregon), United States
- Hood River (Nunavut), Canada
- Hood River (Quebec), in the Watershed of the Saguenay River, Canada

== Places ==
- Hood River, Oregon, a city
- Hood River County, Oregon

== Other ==
- Hood River, a dialect of Upper Chinook language
