= Hoodwink Island =

Island in Graham Land, Antarctica

- Location within Antarctica

Geography
- Location: Antarctica
- Coordinates: 67°1′S 66°52′W

Administration
- Administered under the Antarctic Treaty System

Demographics
- Population: Uninhabited

Hoodwink Island is an island lying 2 kilometres (1 nmi) east of Arrowsmith Peninsula in Lallemand Fjord, Graham Land, Antarctica. It was mapped by the Falkland Islands Dependencies Survey (FIDS) from surveys and air photos, 1955–57, and was so named by the UK Antarctic Place-Names Committee because the island hoodwinked FIDS geologists and surveyors who misinterpreted the island's geological composition and incorrectly identified a nearby survey station during a local triangulation.

== See also ==
- List of Antarctic and sub-Antarctic islands
