= Da Hood =

Da Hood (slang for "the neighborhood") usually refers to an underclass big-city neighborhood, with high crime rates and low-income housing. It may also refer to:

- Da Hood (album), a 1995 album by the Menace Clan
- A rap group signed to Hoo-Bangin' Records
- A rap supergroup; see Mack 10 Presents Da Hood
- "Da Hood", a song by Da Youngsta's from the 1993 album The Aftermath
