= Samuel Hood, 1st Viscount Hood =

Royal Navy officer and politician (1724–1816)

Admiral The Right Honourable The Viscount Hood GCB
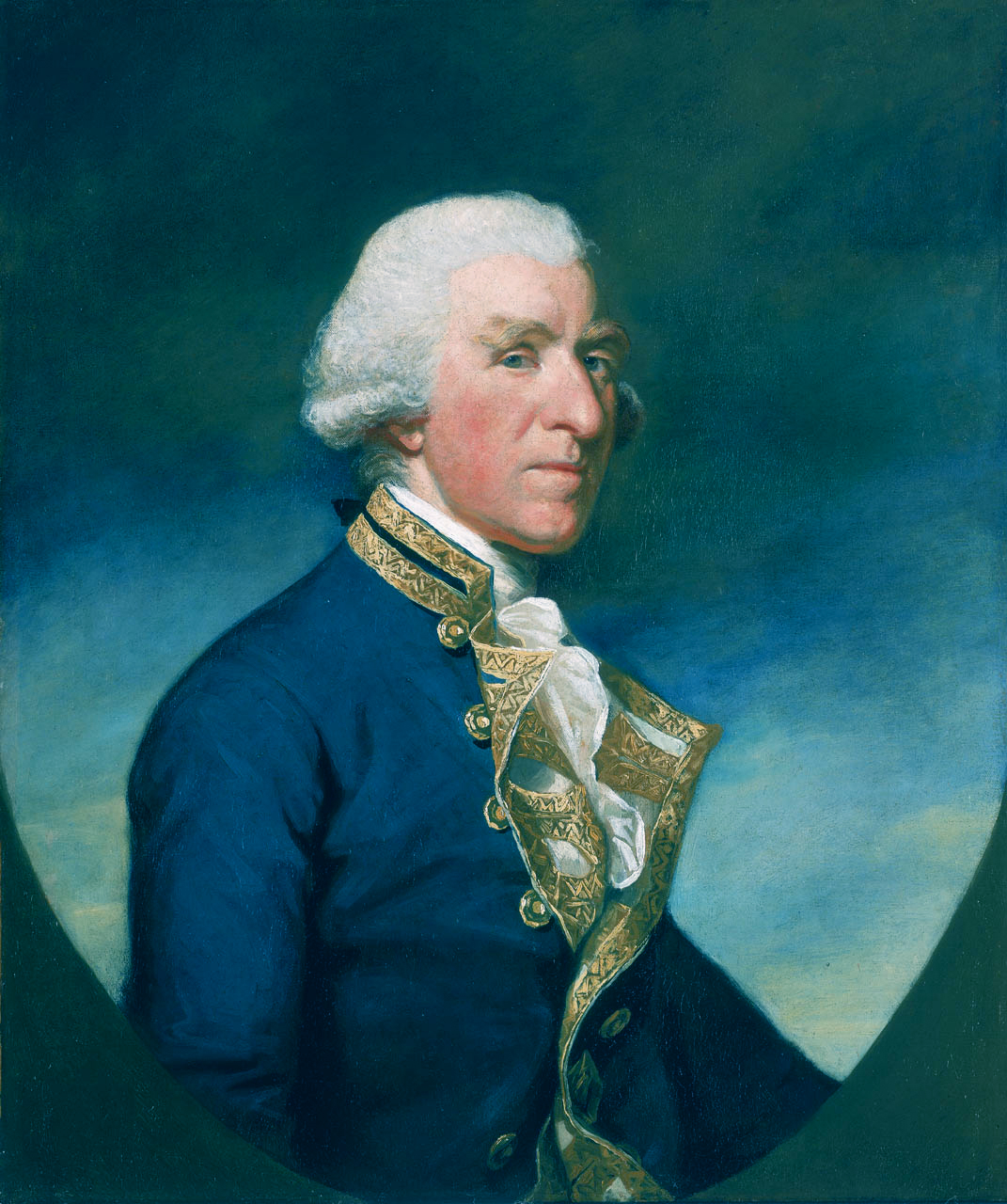
- Portrait by James Northcote, 1784
- Born: 12 December 1724; Butleigh, Somerset, England
- Died: 27 January 1816 (aged 91); London, England
- Spouse: Susannah Linzee
- Children: Henry
- Relatives: Alexander Hood, 1st Viscount Bridport (brother); Sir Samuel Hood, 1st Baronet (first cousin once-removed)
- Military career
- Allegiance: Great Britain
- Branch: Royal Navy
- Service years: 1741–1816
- Rank: Admiral of the Red
- Commands: HMS Jamaica; HMS Lively; HMS Grafton; HMS Antelope; HMS Vestal; HMS Victory; Greenwich Hospital
- Conflicts: Seven Years' War; Raid on Le Havre; American War of Independence; Battle of the Chesapeake; Battle of Saint Kitts; Battle of the Saintes; Battle of the Mona Passage; French Revolutionary Wars; Siege of Toulon; Invasion of Corsica

Admiral of the Red Samuel Hood, 1st Viscount Hood (12 December 1724 – 27 January 1816) was a Royal Navy officer and politician. As a junior officer he saw action during the War of the Austrian Succession. While in temporary command of Antelope, Hood drove a French ship ashore in Audierne Bay, and captured two privateers in 1757 during the Seven Years' War. He held senior command as Commander-in-Chief, North American Station and then as Commander-in-Chief, Leeward Islands Station.

During the American War of Independence, Hood led the British navy to victory at the Battle of the Mona Passage in April 1782. He went on to be Commander-in-Chief, Portsmouth, then First Naval Lord and, after briefly returning to the Portsmouth command, became Commander-in-Chief, Mediterranean Fleet during the French Revolutionary Wars.

First elected in a famously fierce by-election, he served as Tory Member of Parliament for Westminster from 1784 to 1788 and from 1790 to 1796, being Member for Reigate between 1789 and 1790.

His younger brother was Alexander Hood, 1st Viscount Bridport, and his first cousin once-removed was Sir Samuel Hood, 1st Baronet.

== Early life ==
=== Childhood ===
Hood was the eldest son of Rev. Samuel Hood, vicar of Butleigh in Somerset and prebendary of Wells, and Mary Hoskins, daughter of Richard Hoskins, Esq., of Beaminster, Dorset. In 1740, Captain Thomas Smith was stranded in Butleigh when his carriage broke down on the way to Plymouth. The Rev. Samuel Hood rescued him and gave him hospitality for the night. Samuel and his younger brother Alexander were inspired by his stories of the sea and he offered to help them in the Navy. While granting permission for Samuel and Alexander to join the Navy, the Rev. Samuel Hood and his wife decided to prohibit similar service by his other sons as "they might be drowned". Their third son, Arthur William, became Vicar of Butleigh but died of fever in his 30s. Another son drowned in the local River Brue as a boy.

=== Early career ===
Hood joined the Royal Navy as a midshipman in 1741. He served part of his time as midshipman with George Rodney in the Ludlow and became a lieutenant on 17 June 1746. Hood served in the North Sea during the War of the Austrian Succession. On 10 May 1754, he was promoted to master and commander and in the same year made captain of the sloop-of-war Jamaica and commanded her on the North American Station. In July 1756, while still on the North American Station, Hood was promoted to captain and assigned command of the sloop-of-war Lively, which was then under construction in England; however as Hood remained in North America he was unable to assume command of Lively. Still in North America, Hood became flag captain to Commodore Charles Holmes in the Grafton.

=== Seven Years' War ===
At the outbreak of the Seven Years' War in 1756, the navy was rapidly expanded which benefited Hood. In 1757, while in temporary command of Antelope (50 guns), he drove a French ship ashore in Audierne Bay, and captured two privateers. His zeal attracted the favourable notice of the British Admiralty and he was appointed to a ship of his own, Bideford. In 1759, when captain of the Vestal (32 guns), he captured the French Bellone (32 guns) after a sharp action. During the war, his services were wholly in the Channel, and he was engaged under Rodney in 1759 in the Raid on Le Havre, destroying the vessels collected by the French to serve as transports in the proposed invasion of Britain.

He was appointed in Commander-in-Chief, North American Station in July 1767. He returned to England in October 1770 and commissioned the building of Catherington House in the village of Catherington in Hampshire in 1771. In 1778, he accepted a command which in the ordinary course would have terminated his active career, becoming Commissioner of the dockyard at Portsmouth and governor of the Naval Academy.

== American War of Independence ==
In 1778, on the occasion of the King's visit to Portsmouth, Hood was made a baronet. The war was deeply unpopular with much of the British public and navy. Many admirals had declined to serve under Lord Sandwich, the First Lord of the Admiralty. Admiral Rodney, who then commanded in the West Indies, had complained of a lack of proper support from his subordinates, whom he accused of disaffection. The Admiralty, anxious to secure the services of trustworthy flag officers, promoted Hood to Rear-Admiral of the Blue on 26 September 1780, and sent him to the West Indies to act as second in command under Rodney, who knew him personally. He joined Rodney in January 1781 in his flagship Barfleur, and remained in the West Indies or on the coast of North America until the close of the American War of Independence.

The expectation that he would work harmoniously with Rodney was not entirely justified. Their correspondence shows that they were not on friendly terms; but Hood always did his duty, and he was so able that no question of removing him from the station ever arose. The unfortunate turn for the British taken by the campaign of 1781 was largely due to Rodney's neglect of Hood's advice.

=== Battle of the Chesapeake ===
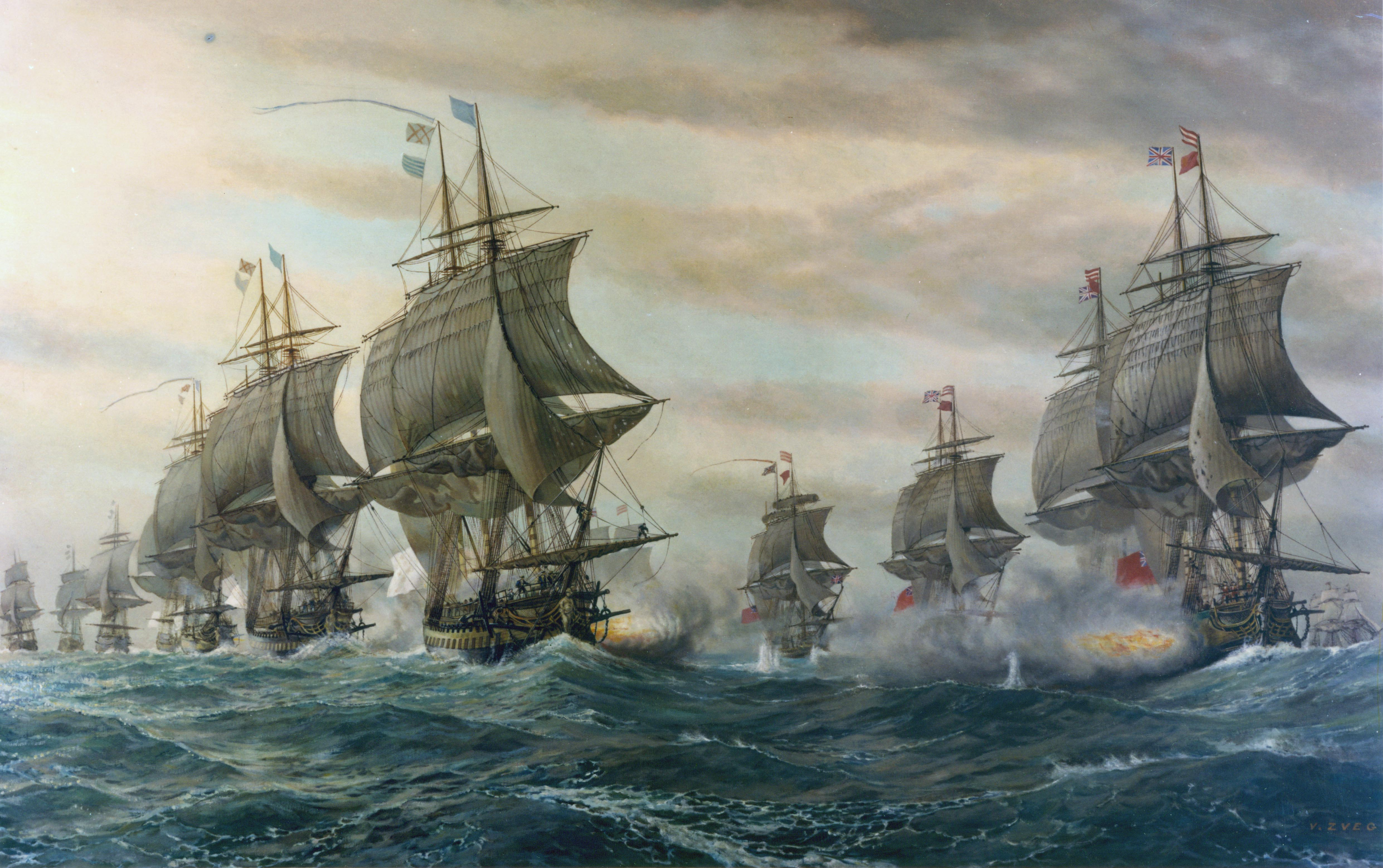
The Battle of the Chesapeake, at which Hood was defeated

When Rodney decided to return to Britain for the sake of his health in the autumn of 1781, Hood was ordered to take the bulk of the fleet to the North American coast during the hurricane months. Hood joined Thomas Graves in the unsuccessful effort to relieve the army at Yorktown, when the British fleet was driven off by a French fleet under François Joseph Paul de Grasse, at the Battle of the Chesapeake.

When he returned to the West Indies, he was for a time in independent command, as commander-in-chief of the Leeward Islands Station, owing to Rodney's absence in England. De Grasse attacked the British islands of St Kitts and Nevis with a force much superior to Hood's squadron. Hood made an unsuccessful attempt in January 1782 to save them from capture, with 22 ships to 29, and the series of bold movements by which he first turned the French out of their anchorage at Basseterre of St Kitts and then beat off their attacks, were one of the best accomplishments of any British admiral during the war.

=== Battle of the Saintes ===
On 12 April 1782 Hood took part in a British fleet under Rodney, which defeated a combined French and Spanish fleet that was planning an invasion of Jamaica. The French commander De Grasse, who had been responsible for the victory at Chesapeake, was captured and taken back to Britain as a prisoner.

=== Battle of the Mona Passage ===
Eventually Hood was ordered to chase, and with his division of 12 ships he captured 4 ships at the Mona Passage on 19 April 1782, thus completing the defeat. While serving in the Caribbean, Hood became acquainted with, and later became a mentor to, Horatio Nelson, who was a young frigate captain. Hood had been a friend of Nelson's uncle Maurice Suckling. In 1782 Hood introduced Nelson to the Duke of Clarence, the future King William IV, who was then a serving naval officer in New York.

=== Peace ===
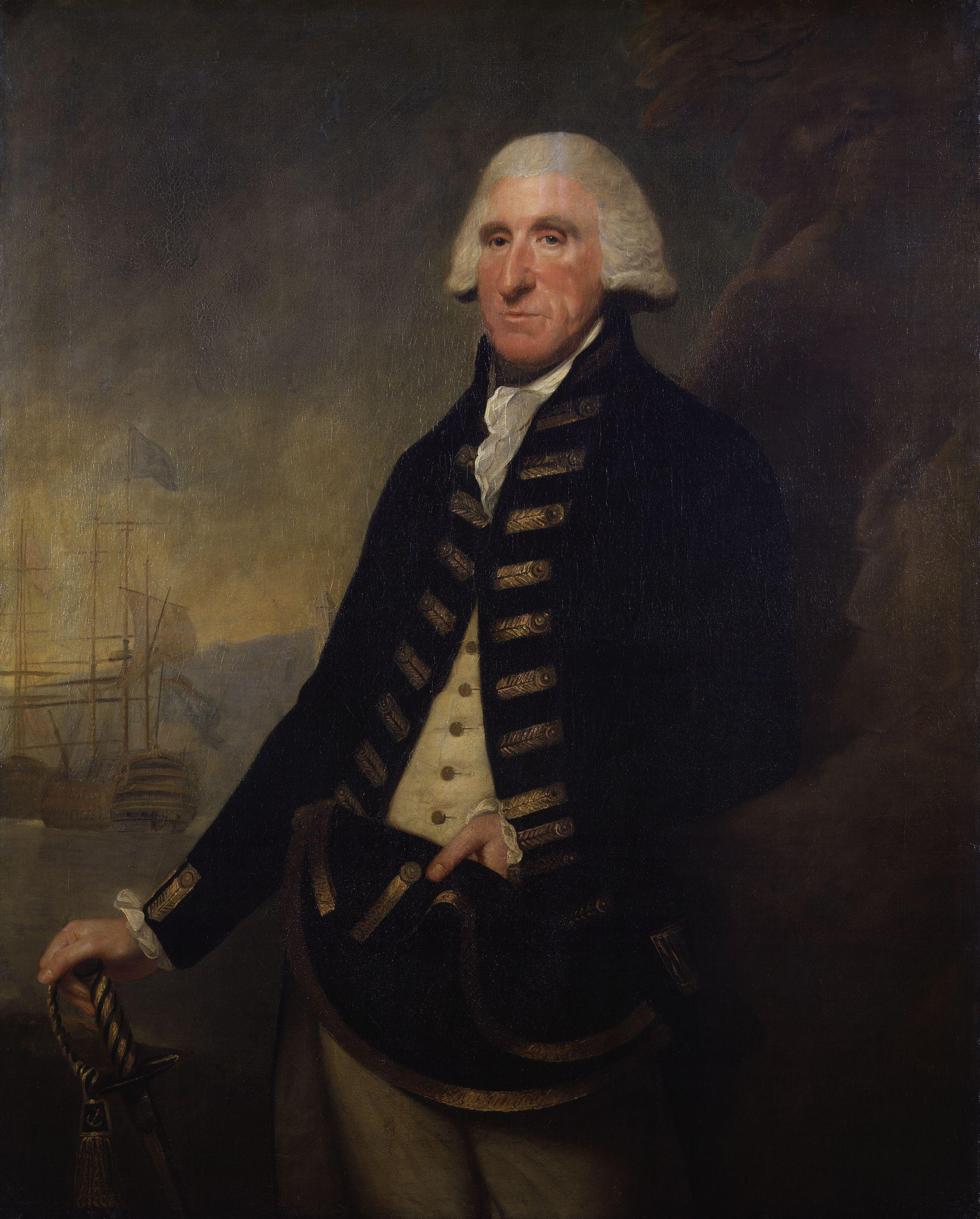
1795 portrait of Hood by Lemuel Francis Abbott

Hood was made an Irish peer as Baron Hood of Catherington in September 1782. During the peace, he entered the British Parliament as an MP for Westminster in the election of 1784 where he was a supporter of the government of William Pitt the Younger. He became Commander-in-Chief, Portsmouth in 1786, after being promoted to Vice-Admiral of the Blue on 24 September 1787, retired from the Portsmouth Command in 1789. He was appointed to the Board of Admiralty under John Pitt, 2nd Earl of Chatham, brother of the Prime Minister, in July 1788 and became First Naval Lord in August 1789. He became Commander-in-Chief, Portsmouth again in June 1792.

Hood presided at the court-martial of some of surviving instigators of the mutiny on the Bounty, beginning on 12 September 1792. Among those on trial were crew members who were loyal to Bounty's commanding officer, William Bligh, but were forced to remain on the ship after Bligh was cast away in an open boat. Of the ten defendants, four were acquitted and the remaining six were found guilty of mutiny and sentenced to death. Three were recommended for mercy and were pardoned. The other men found guilty were hanged from the yardarm of HMS Brunswick on 29 October 1794.

== French Revolution ==
=== Defence of Toulon ===
On 1 February 1793, the same day Revolutionary France declared war on Britain and brought it into the War of the First Coalition, Hood was promoted to Vice-Admiral of the Red. In the same month, he was appointed as the commander-in-chief of the Mediterranean Fleet. In August 1793 French royalists and federalists took over the city of Toulon and invited Hood, whose fleet was blockading offshore, to occupy it. Hood, without time to request instructions from the Admiralty in London, moved swiftly to take command of Toulon.

Hood occupied the city in co-operation with Spanish and Sardinian forces. In December of the same year, the allies, who did not work harmoniously together, were driven out, mainly by the generalship of Napoleon. Hood ordered the French fleet in Toulon to be burned to prevent it falling back into the hands of the revolutionary government in Paris.

=== Corsica ===
Hood then turned to the capture of French-held Corsica, which he had been invited to take in the name of the King of Britain by Pasquale Paoli, who had been leader of the Corsican Republic before it was conquered by France between 1768 and 1769. The island was for a short time added to the dominions of George III, chiefly by the exertions of the fleet and the co-operation of Paoli. While the occupation of Corsica was being effected, the French at Toulon had so far recovered that they were able to send a fleet to sea. Horatio Nelson was recorded as saying that Hood was "the best Officer, take him altogether, that England has to boast of".

In October, he was recalled to England in consequence of some misunderstanding with the admiralty or the ministry, which has never been explained. Richard Freeman, in his book, The Great Edwardian Naval Feud, explains his relief from command in a quote from Lord Esher's journal. According to this journal, "... [Hood] wrote 'a very temperate letter' to the Admiralty in which he complained that he did not have enough ships to defend the Mediterranean." As a result, Hood was then recalled from the Mediterranean. He was promoted to Admiral of the Blue on 12 April 1794.

=== Later career ===
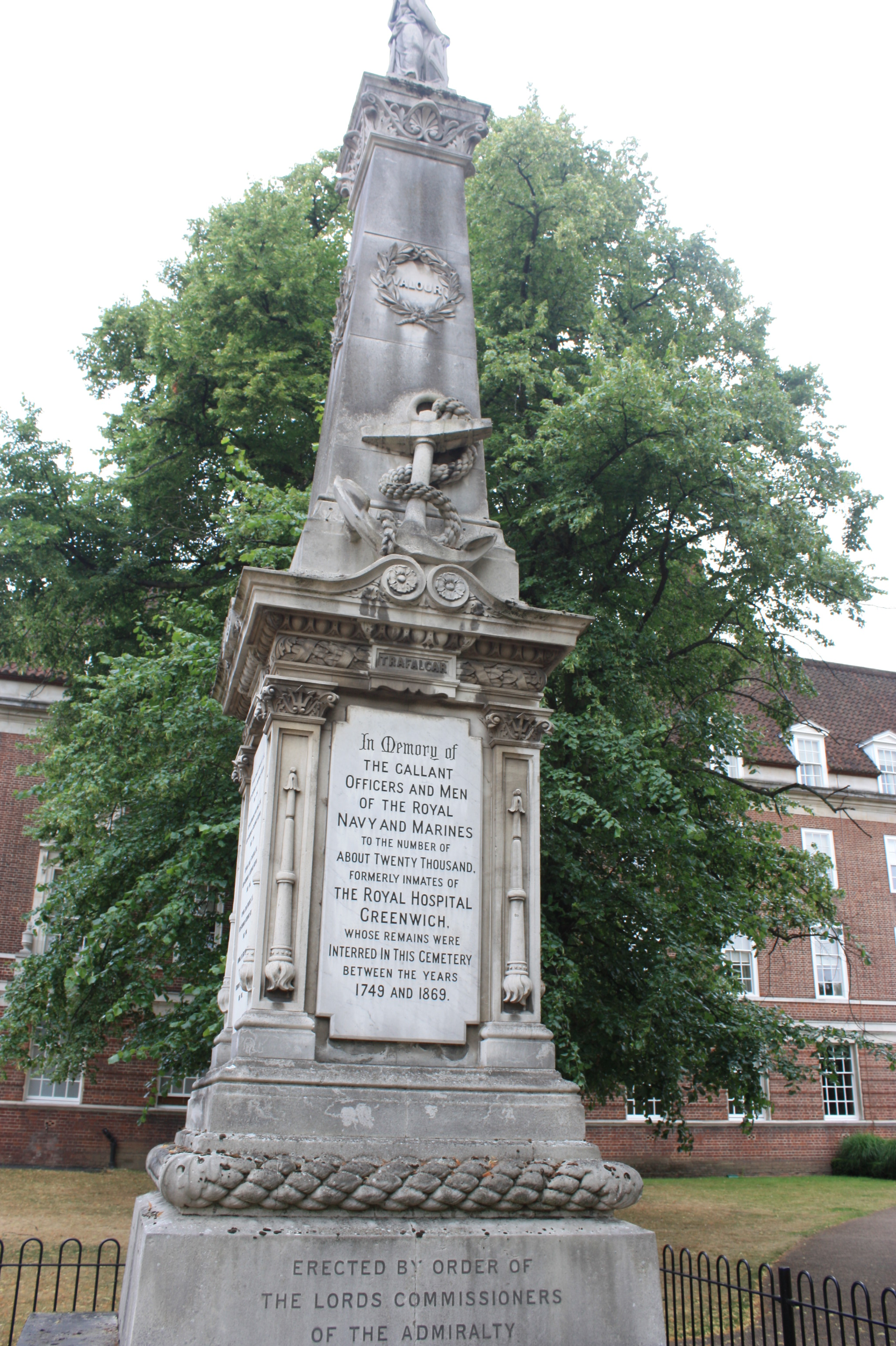
The Officers Monument, Greenwich Hospital Cemetery

Hood was created Viscount Hood of Whitley, Warwickshire in 1796 with a pension of £2000 per year for life (about £200,000 a year in 2025 terms). In 1796, he was also appointed Governour of the Greenwich Hospital, a position which he held until his death. He served as Tory Member of Parliament for Westminster from 1784 to 1788 and from 1790 to 1796, and was Member for Reigate between 1789 and 1790. Hood was promoted to Admiral of the White on 14 February 1799 and again to Admiral of the Red on 9 October 1805. He died in Greenwich on 27 January 1816 and is buried in Greenwich Hospital Cemetery. A peerage of Great Britain was conferred on his wife, Susannah, as Baroness Hood of Catherington in 1795. Hood's titles descended to his youngest son, Henry (1753–1836).

There are several portraits of Lord Hood by Lemuel Francis Abbott in the Guildhall and in the National Portrait Gallery. He was also painted by Joshua Reynolds and Thomas Gainsborough.

== Marriage and issue ==
In 1749 he married Susannah Linzee (1726–1806) (whose monument survives at Davenport House, Greenwich (Former Hospital Cemetery)), a daughter of Edward Linzee, Master Ropemaker at Portsmouth Dockyard, and Mayor of Portsmouth. By his wife he had issue including:

- Henry Hood, 2nd Viscount Hood (1753–1836), son and heir.

== Legacy ==
A biographical notice of Hood by McArthur, his secretary during the Mediterranean command, appeared in the Naval Chronicle, vol. ii. His correspondence during his command in America was published by the Navy Records Society.

In 1792, Lieutenant William Broughton, sailing with the expedition of George Vancouver to the Northwest Coast of North America, named Mount Hood in present-day Oregon, and Hood Canal in present-day Washington, after Hood. Port Hood, Nova Scotia, is also named after him.

Two of the three ships of the Royal Navy named HMS Hood were named after him as well. One of these, the battlecruiser HMS Hood (51), was sunk by the German battleship Bismarck in 1941 during the Second World War.

== Portrayal ==
Hood was portrayed by David Torrence in the 1935 film Mutiny on the Bounty.

== See also ==
Several other members of the Hood family were notable figures in British history:

- Alexander Hood, 1st Viscount Bridport, his brother, was also an Admiral.
- Samuel Hood (1705–1805), his cousin, was a purser.
- Sir Samuel Hood (1762–1814), his cousin once removed, was a Rear Admiral.
- Alexander Hood (1758–1798), brother of Sir Samuel Hood, was killed in the Battle of the Raz de Sein.
- Horace Hood (1870–1916) descended from Admiral Hood, was killed in the Battle of Jutland.
- Samuel Hood, 6th Viscount Hood (1910–1981) descendant of Admiral Hood and inheritor of the viscountcy, Foreign Office official and diplomat.
- List of ships called HMS Hood

== Sources ==
- Adkins, Lesley and Roy (2007). The War For All the Oceans. Abacus.
- Freeman, Richard (2009). The Great Edwardian Naval Feud Beresford's Vendetta against 'Jackie Fisher'. Pen & Sword Maritime.
- Harvey, Robert (2004). A Few Bloody Noses: The American Revolutionary War. Constable and Robinson.
- Lambert, Andrew (2008). Admirals: The Naval Commanders Who Made Britain Great. Fabre and Faber.
- Lambert, Andrew (2005). Nelson: Brittania's God of War. Faber and Faber.
- Rodger, N.A.M. (1979). The Admiralty. Offices of State. Lavenham: T. Dalton Ltd. ISBN 0900963948.

Parliament of Great Britain
Preceded by Charles James Fox; Sir Cecil Wray	Member of Parliament for Westminster; 1784–1788; With: Charles James Fox	Succeeded by Charles James Fox; Lord John Townshend
Preceded by William Bellingham; Reginald Pole-Carew	Member of Parliament for Reigate; 1789–1790; With: Reginald Pole-Carew	Succeeded by John Somers Cock; Joseph Sydney Yorke
Preceded by Charles James Fox; Lord John Townshend	Member of Parliament for Westminster; 1790–1796; With: Charles James Fox	Succeeded by Charles James Fox; Sir Alan Gardner
Military offices
Preceded by Archibald Kennedy	Commander-in-Chief, North American Station; 1767–1770	Succeeded by James Gambier
Preceded by Sir George Brydges Rodney	Commander-in-Chief, Leeward Islands Station; 1781–1782	Succeeded by Sir George Brydges Rodney
Preceded by John Montagu	Commander-in-Chief, Portsmouth; 1786–1789	Succeeded by Robert Roddam
Preceded by John Leveson-Gower	First Naval Lord; 1789–1795	Succeeded by Sir Charles Middleton
Preceded by Robert Roddam	Commander-in-Chief, Portsmouth; 1792–1793	Succeeded by Sir Peter Parker
Preceded by Samuel Goodall	Commander-in-Chief, Mediterranean Fleet; 1793–1794	Succeeded by Lord Hotham
Preceded by Sir Hugh Palliser	Governor, Greenwich Hospital; 1796–1816	Succeeded by Sir John Colpoys
Peerage of Great Britain
New creation	Viscount Hood; 1796–1816	Succeeded by Henry Hood
Peerage of Ireland
New creation	Baron Hood; 1782–1816	Succeeded by Henry Hood
Baronetage of Great Britain
New creation	Baronet of Catherington; 1778–1816	Succeeded by Henry Hood
