= Hoodlum =

Thug, usually in a group of misfits

A hoodlum is a thug, usually in a group of misfits who are associated with crime or theft.

== Early use ==
The earliest reference to the word "hoodlum" was in the December 14, 1866, San Francisco Daily Evening Bulletin after the Hoodlum Band was arrested on December 13, 1866. Members of the gang were sentenced to the Industrial School for stealing clothes. The gang used many keys to enter hotel rooms and boarding houses. On December 14, 1866, Lazarus Moses was arrested for selling clothes stolen by the Hoodlum Band. Moses was fined $300. Moses's nickname was Fagin. The public read about the acts of the Hoodlum Band, and the word hoodlum became a synonym for a young thug.

The term was associated with anti-Chinese violence. An article in The New York Times of July 26, 1877, stated: "People who sack Chinese houses and stone Chinamen are not workingmen. San Francisco calls them 'hoodlums,' a term which includes everything that is base and mean. The hoodlum is a non-producer, loafer and bully. The hoodlum class think this is a good time to signify their hatred of law and order."

== Etymology ==
While the term is endemic to San Francisco, the origins of "hoodlum" are unclear. Possible explanations include: Dennis Kearney's rally call to "huddle 'em up", organizing unemployed Irishmen prior to attacking and looting Chinese people and businesses; a derivation from the Swabian word hudelum ("disorderly") or the Bavarian Haderlump ("ragamuffin"); or derived from a gang named Hood's Boys, named after Hood's Saloon, the gang's base of operations in San Francisco. As early as 1876, the origins of "hoodlum" were described as lost.

== See also ==
- Hooligan
- Gangster
