= Hood (rail transport) =

Rigid cover to protect a load

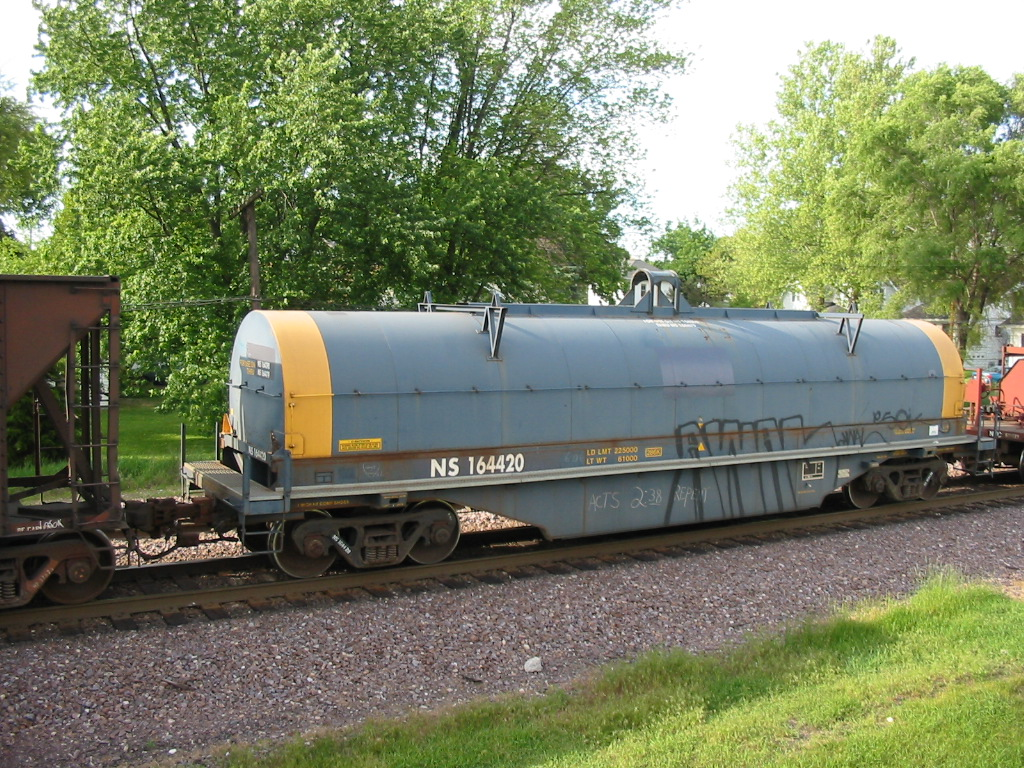
A steel coil car owned by Norfolk Southern Railway. The load is covered by a hood

A hood is a rigid cover to protect a load on a flatcar, gondola or a coil car. Gondola hoods developed from loose tarpaulin covers that were deemed unsatisfactory in damp climates; but tarpaulins are still used as hoods in some cases. For some gondola loads, hoods made of fiberglass were sufficient. The hoods on coil cars were originally permanently attached to the cars when they were developed in the mid-20th century.

Hoods could also be mounted on wheels enabling them to slide out of the way toward one end of the car for loading.
