= MAN KAT1 =

MAN Category 1
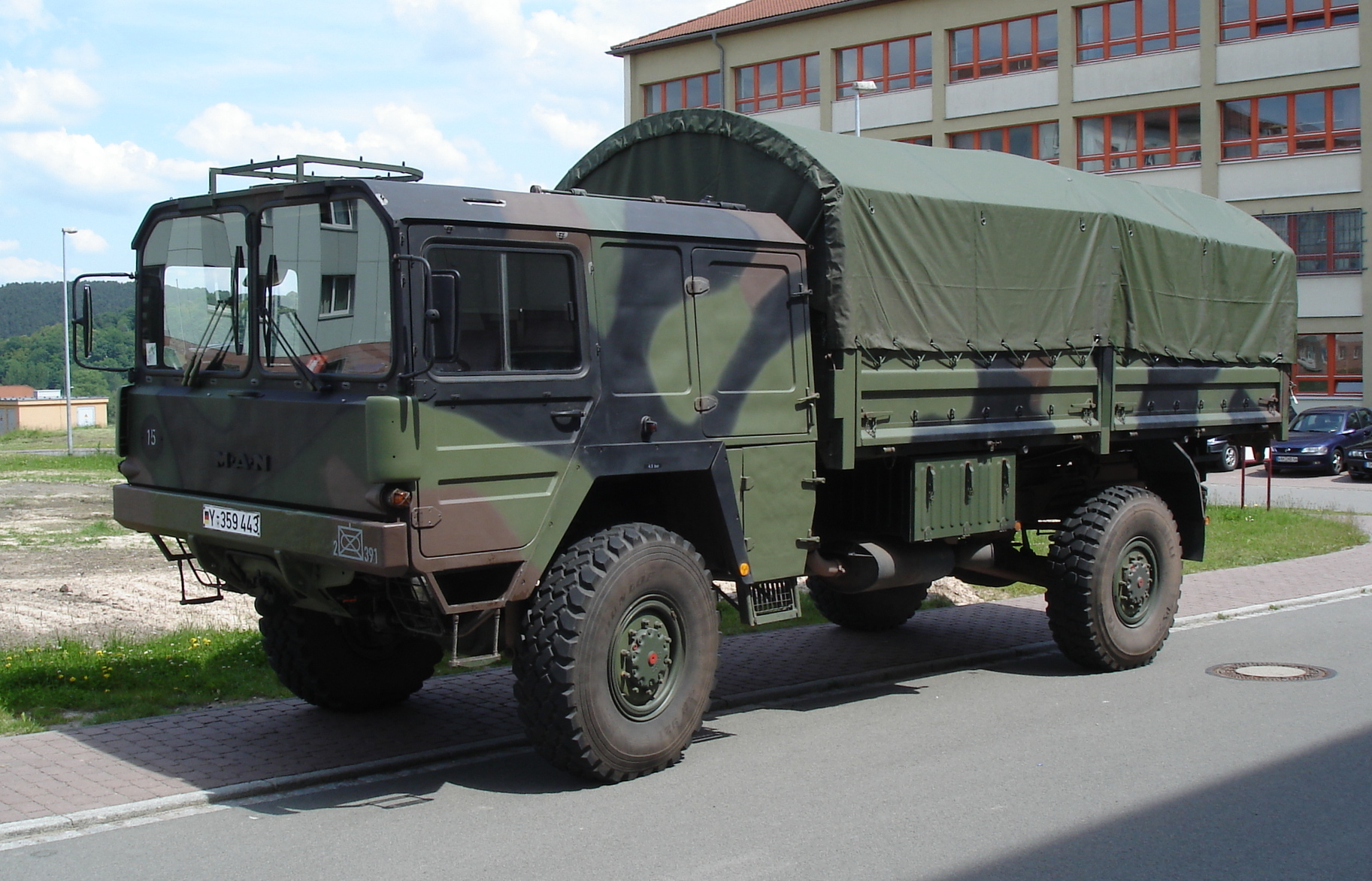
- MAN Category 1 5,000 kg 4×4 cargo truck of the German Bundeswehr. When fitted with a winch, the Bundeswehr designation for this vehicle is Type 461 LKW 5t mil gl MW Pritsche, without a winch, the designation is Type 451 LKW 5t mil gl Pritsche
- Type: 8×8, 6×6, and 4×4 off-road trucks
- Place of origin: West Germany

Service history
- Used by: West Germany, Belgium, France, Canada, Austria, USA, Estonia, The Netherlands, Denmark and probably others

Production history
- Manufacturer: MAN SE; RMMV would now be the design parent
- Produced: 1976-1981 (Category 1)
- No. built: 9110 (approx)

Specifications
- Crew: 1 + 1
- Engine: MAN water-cooled diesel (KHD air-cooled diesel in early models) varied by model
- Payload capacity: 5,000 kg (4×4), 7,000 kg (6×6), 10,000 kg (8×8); Category 1 A1 increased 8×8 payload to 15,000 kg
- Transmission: usually ZF manual with torque convertor and two-speed transfer case
- Suspension: coil springs and dampers for each axle
- Steering system: power-assisted on front axle(s)

The MAN Category 1 is a family of high-mobility off-road trucks developed by MAN SE for the German army. Production continued through an evolution of the design with the final iteration (SX) in production until early 2019.

== History ==
In the late 1950s and early 1960s the West German Technical Office for Armament and Military Purchases drew up requirements for a new range (or second generation) of vehicles for the army. Covering all weight classes and mobility levels, the Bundeswehrʼs second-generation requirement originally called for 62,000 vehicles (of all classes including cars and buses) including four-tonne 4×4, seven-tonne 6×6, and 10-tonne 8×8 trucks; 4×4 and 6×6 armoured amphibious load carriers; and an 8×8 amphibious reconnaissance vehicle.

To meet development and production demands, a joint venture led by MAN and including Klöckner-Humboldt-Deutz (KHD), Rheinstahl-Henschel, Krupp (which later dropped out), and Büssing (acquired by MAN in 1971) was set up. The first prototype vehicles were shown at the end of the 1960s, and a further two prototype series were developed before the first genuine pre-production vehicles were designed and built. Along the development trail it became clear that the highly technical vehicles would simply not be affordable as originally specified, so many of the more ambitious 'wish list' features were dropped. The total number to procure was also cut down to 18,000. In 1972, the amphibious specification and the requirement for the vehicles to be powered by an air-cooled multifuel engine were dropped. In 1975, the four-tonne rating was uprated to five-tonne while stretching that model’s bed, along with increasing the wheelbase from 4.3 to 4.5 m.

In December 1975, MAN was awarded a contract to build 8,385 4×4, 6×6, and 8×8 Category 1 vehicles at a cost of DM 1.4 million; this production total was further reduced to 7,925 in 1979. The umbrella corporation to make these trucks was now Rheinmetall MAN Military Vehicles (RMMV).

The 8×8 version was the first Category 1 model to enter production and started to be delivered in 1976. A 6×6 tipper and the 4×4 cargo truck followed in 1977. Deliveries of the 6×6 cargo truck began in January 1979; the final units were supplied in 1981. By 1983, 8,617 vehicles of all Category 1 configurations had been delivered to the West German armed forces, and while exact totals are unknown, the Bundeswehr did receive a total of seven 5,000 kg 4×4 variants, 14 variants of the 7,000 kg 6×6, and nine 8×8 10,000 kg variants. The complete range of Category 1 vehicles were produced at MAN’s Watenstedt plant in Germany.

Category I vehicles underwent a complete overhaul in the mid-1990s to extend their service life by another ten years, and replacement has only recently begun in earnest. Some ex-military MAN Category 1 vehicles have been released on the second-hand market in Germany.

=== Production figures ===
Year	Production figures	5t 4×4	7t 6×6	10t 8×8	14.240	20.280	27365 (US)	27365
1977	3078	479	183	2416	0	0	0	0
1978	3242	1899	614	729	0	0	0	0
1979	2403	487	1435	481	0	0	0	0
1980	897	682	205	0	10	0	0	0
1981	884	50	267	279	0	267	21	0
1982	662	4	140	11	203	246	56	2
1983	403	0	60	3	52	108	123	57
1984	402	0	0	0	14	125	124	139
1985	135	0	0	0	53	22	59	1
1986	163	0	0	0	12	7	140	4
Sum	12269	3601	2904	3919	344	775	523	203

== Description ==
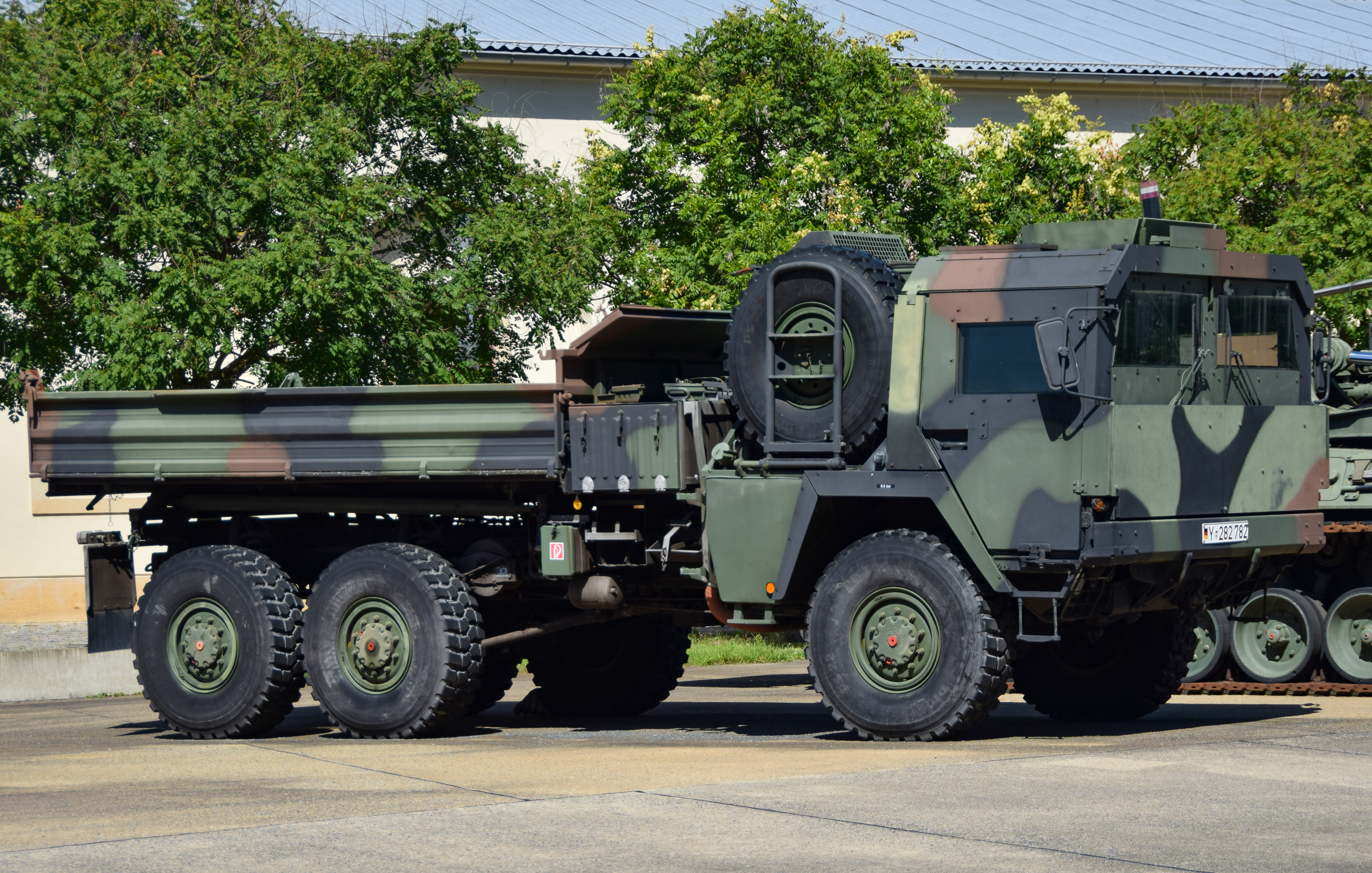
A MAN 7t mil gl MSA truck of the Bundeswehr

Introduced as the mil gl (for "militarisiert geländegängig" - military, cross country mobile), the MAN Category 1 series was used by all branches of the Bundeswehr. Militarisation includes a fully separate blackout lights circuit, a military instrument layout with blackout option, an emergency stop switch to cut electrical power, a roof hatch with machine gun mount, and rifle brackets.

All Category 1 (and follow-on series) share a modular design. They have a torsionally rigid box-section chassis frame with rigid hub-reduction axles sprung by coil springs and shock-absorbers. The engine is mounted inside the forward-control cab, which is separated into a driver and engine compartment by a firewall. The engine is located to the rear of the driver compartment instead of beneath it to keep the overall height below 2.9 m and make the trucks rail-mobile on standard flatcars. The characteristic, cut-away corners of the otherwise box-shaped cab serve to keep dimensions within the railway loading gauge. The cab of early production examples does not tilt forward for maintenance because these vehicles were still based on the amphibious prototypes. The tilting cab was only introduced in the mid-80s.

The KHD air-cooled diesel engine drives all axles via a torque converter, semi-automatic transmission and a transfer case, these components forming a single unit. The follow-on A1 series employed a far greater number of off-the-shelf standard truck components. For the extraterritorial deployment of the Bundeswehr, some vehicles were fitted with an additional modular armour (modulare Schutzausstattung, MSA) to increase crew protection.

== Category 2 (US military) ==
The United States Army and the United States Air Force operated four derivations of the KAT 1 8×8, these known as Category 2 trucks and designated M1001, M1002, M1013 and M1014 by the US military. Category 2 trucks were developed at the request of, and in close co-operation with, the US armed forces.

- Truck Tractor w/Crane, 10-ton, 8×8 M1001 (NSN 2320-12-191-5422)
- Truck Tractor w/Crane, 10-ton, 8×8, M1002 (NSN 2320-12-191-5423)
- Truck Tractor w/Crane, 10-ton, 8×8, M1013 (NSN 2320-12-191-5424)
- Truck Tractor w/o Crane, 10-ton, 8×8, M1014 (NSN 2320-12-191-5425)

The M1001 was used by the US Army as the prime mover for the Pershing II nuclear missile. The tractor was configured with a fifth wheel to tow the erector launcher, an Atlas Maschinen GmbH 8-ton crane for handling missile components and a 30 kW generator to power the erector launcher. The M1002 was configured as a recovery vehicle with a Rotzler recovery unit, earth spades, Atlas Maschinen GmbH AK4300 M5 crane, and carriers for two erector launcher spare tires.

The M1013 was used by the US Air Force as the prime mover for the Gryphon Ground Launched Cruise Missile (GLCM). The tractor was configured with a fifth wheel to tow the launcher, a 2-ton material handling crane and a self-recovery winch. The M1014 was also configured as a prime mover and had a tire carrier for a launcher spare tire.

By the end of 1986, 534 Category 2 trucks had been delivered to the US, with 157 delivered to France, and 42 to Canada.

== Category 3 ==
In a parallel development to the category 1, the so-called Category 3 trucks were developed. These are similar to the Category I vehicles, but are fitted with a cab from the MAN civilian truck range, modified for military use. A total of 1,594 Category 3 trucks were delivered to Algeria (280), Ireland, Oman (95), Peru (165), Singapore (104), Venezuela (405), and others including some commercial users.

== Category 1 A1 and 1 A1.1 ==
In April 1985 MAN presented the first of the revised Category I A1 models to the German Federal Office for Military Technology and Procurement (BWB) and to the Test Centre 41 facility. It was planned that there would be 35 test vehicles of all configurations, including an extra wide 8×8 version for the Patriot and Roland systems. Production of the new category vehicles began in 1987. The Category I A1 generation was a development of the Category I with improved performance on- and off-road owing to higher power output engines and an improved design of chassis and cab. Category 1 A1 included a new (as a direct replacement for the earlier Kat 1 10,000 kg) 15,000 kg 8×8 weight class.

From 1988, the Bundeswehr ordered 1,100 Cat 1A1 models. Category 1 A1 models developed from 1988 carry the Category 1 A1.1 designation. Category 1 A1 models used some commercial components from MAN's F90 range of heavy commercial trucks introduced in 1986, while the later Category 1A1.1 models were developed between 1988 and 1991 and were based on components from MAN’s F2000 range of heavy commercial trucks introduced in 1992.

From 1993 the Bundeswehr ordered about 500 MAN Category 1 A1.1 trucks. The MAN designation of SX range became prevalent for the Category 1 A1.1 in the early 1990s and was applied to final derivations of the category 1 product, these remaining in production as SX44 and SX45 until early 2019.

A range of high performance airfield crash tenders were produced on the Cat 1 A1 extra-wide (2.9 m) chassis, and continued to be produced on the successor SX range 2.9 m wide chassis.

== Gallery ==
MAN Category 1 and derivatives

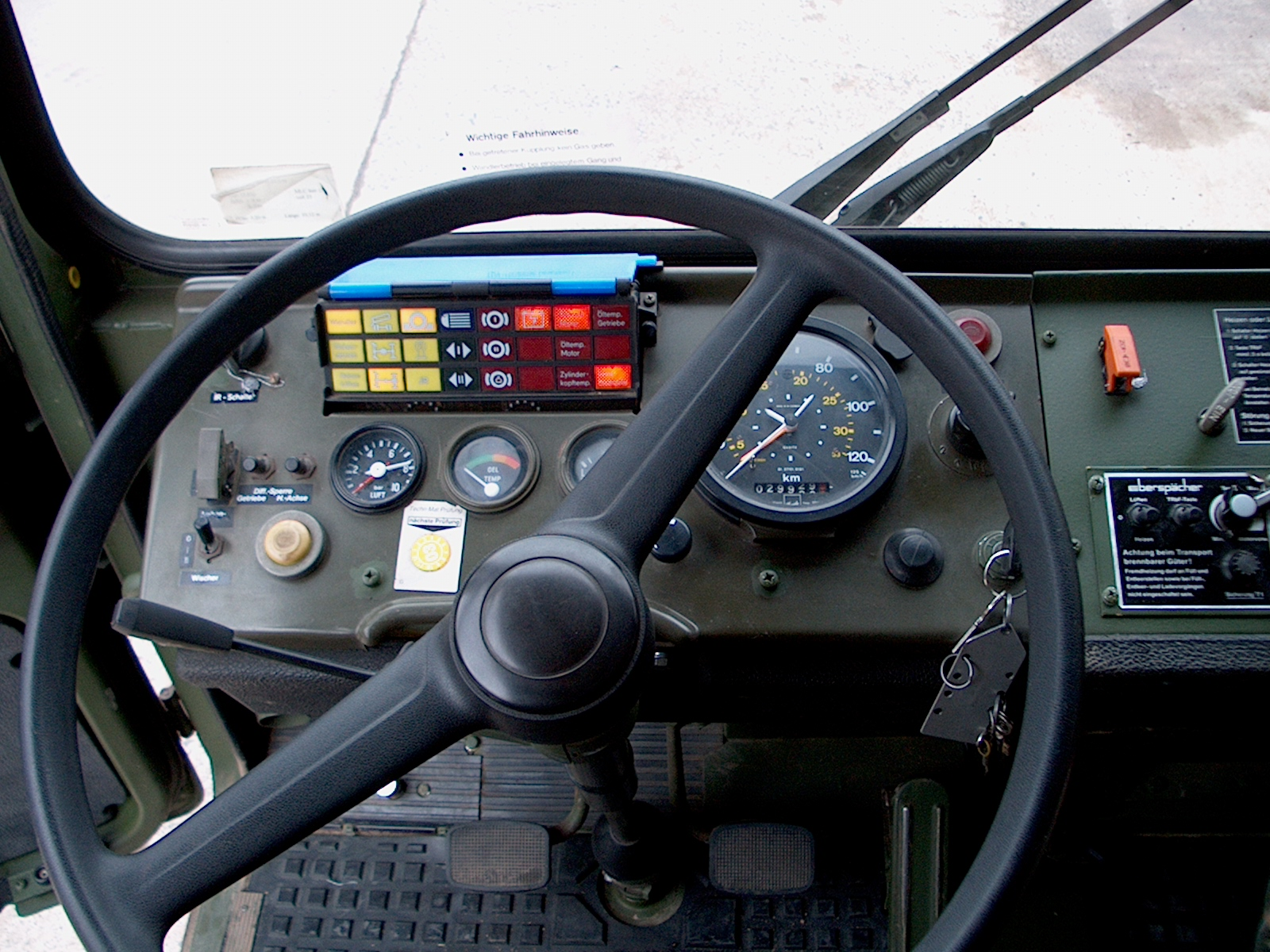
Cabin interior of a Category 1 truck

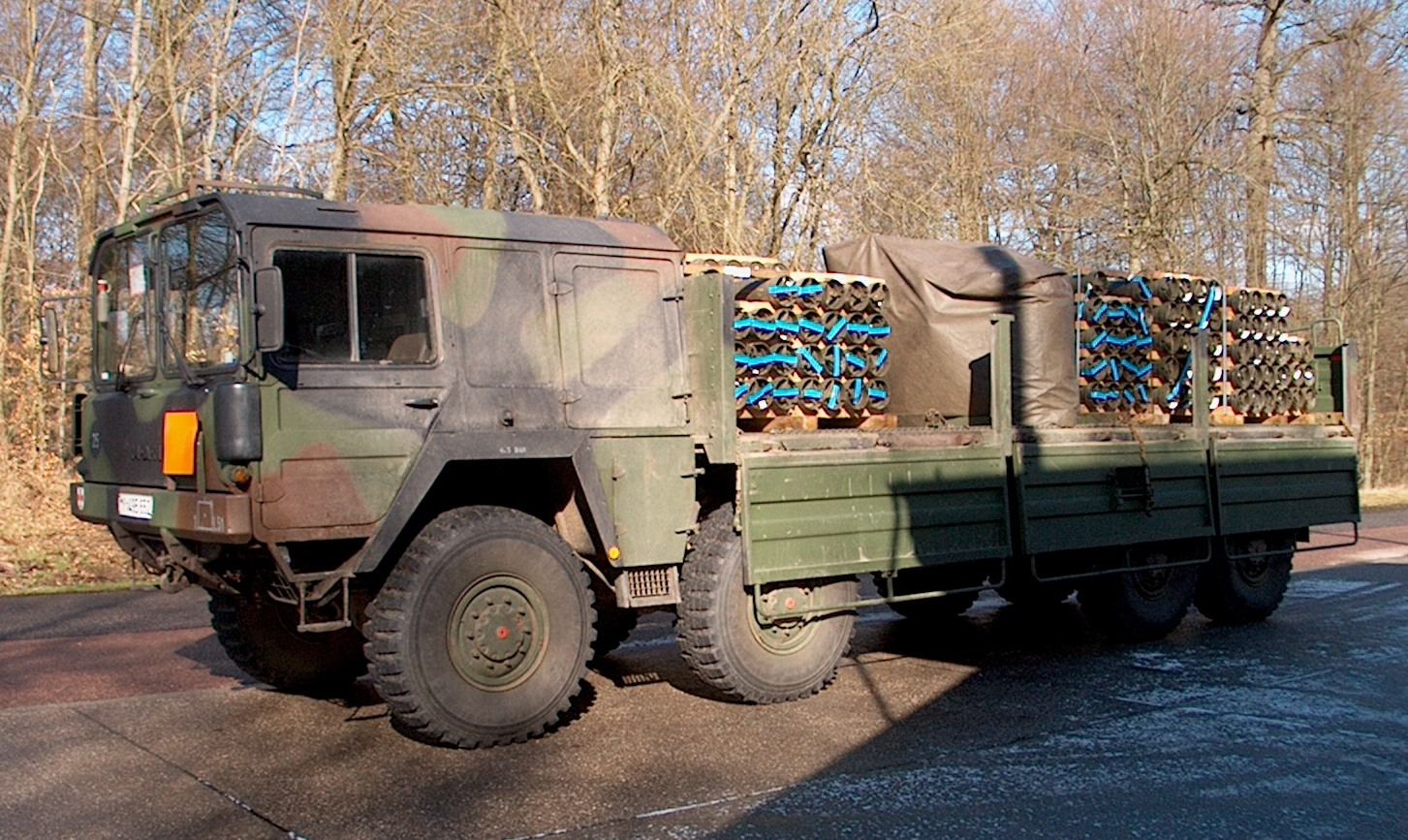
MAN Category I Type 464 LKW 10t mil gl MW Pritsche Kran 10,000 kg 8×8 cargo truck of the German Bundeswehr fitted with a self-recovery winch and body-mounted materials handling crane

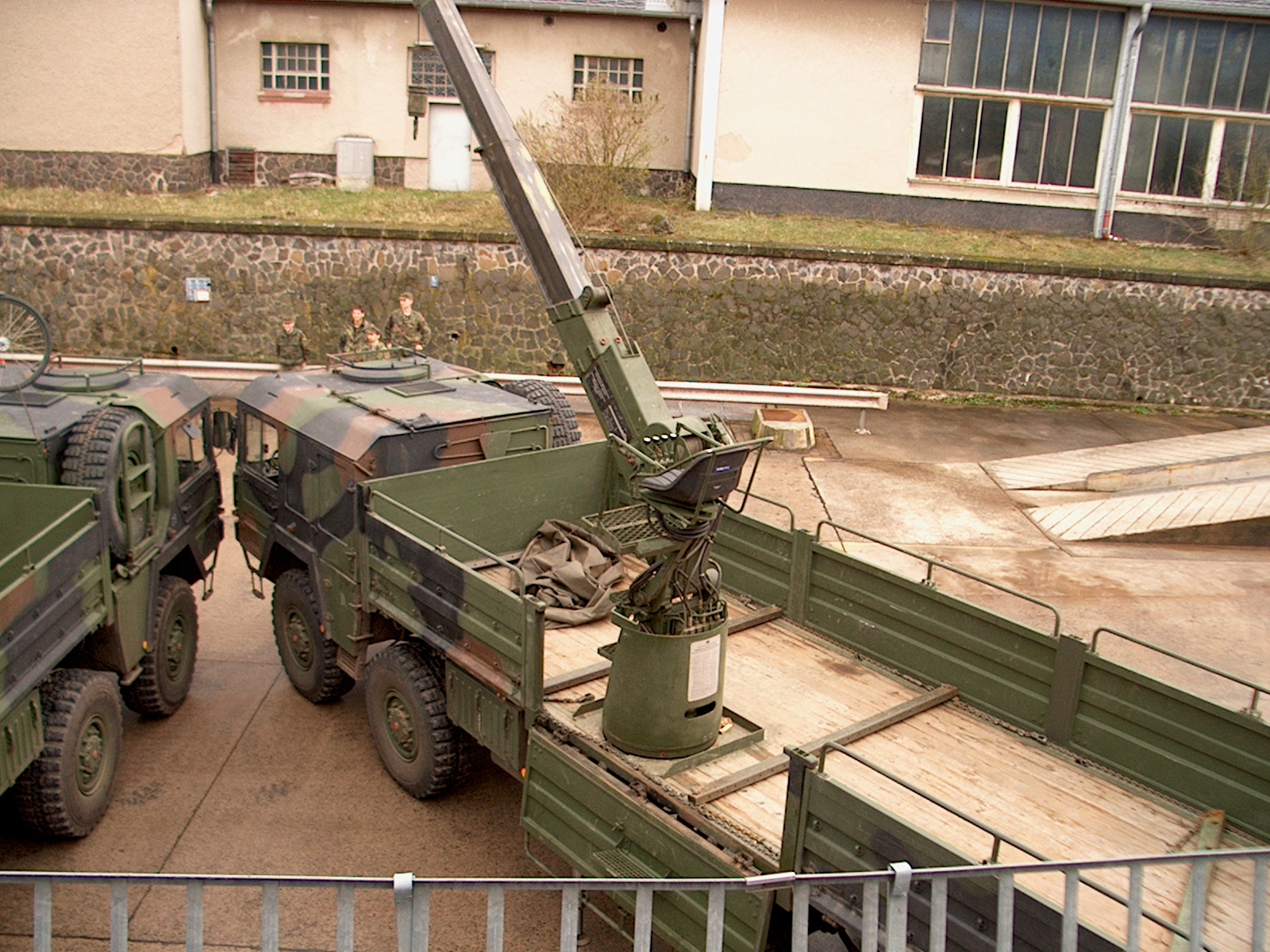
MAN Category I Type 464 LKW 10t mil gl MW Pritsche Kran 10,000 kg 8×8 cargo truck of the German Bundeswehr fitted with a self-recovery winch and body-mounted materials handling crane; the Atlas-Weyhausen 1-ton loading crane is deployed

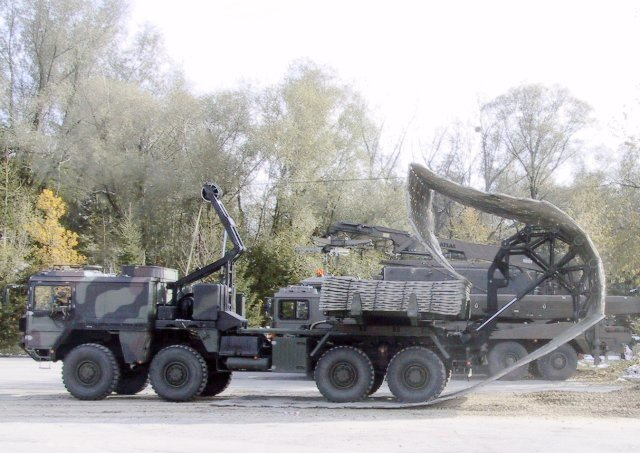
MAN Category 1 A1 with mobile field-deployable road system

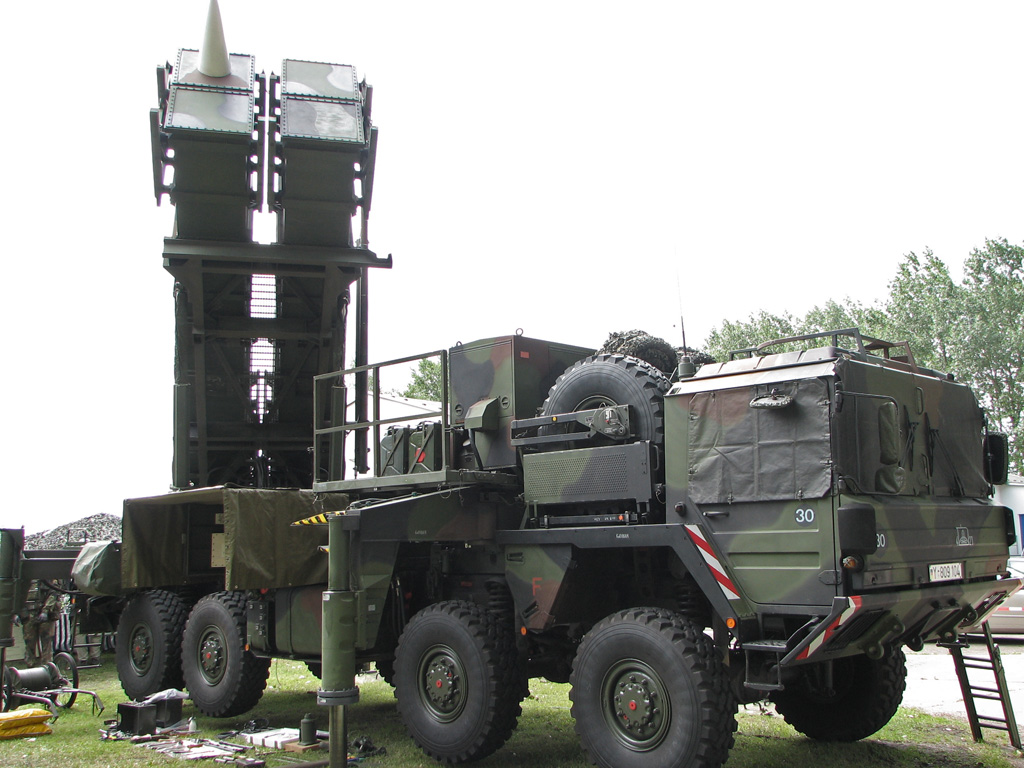
MAN Category 1 A1 with Patriot weapon system

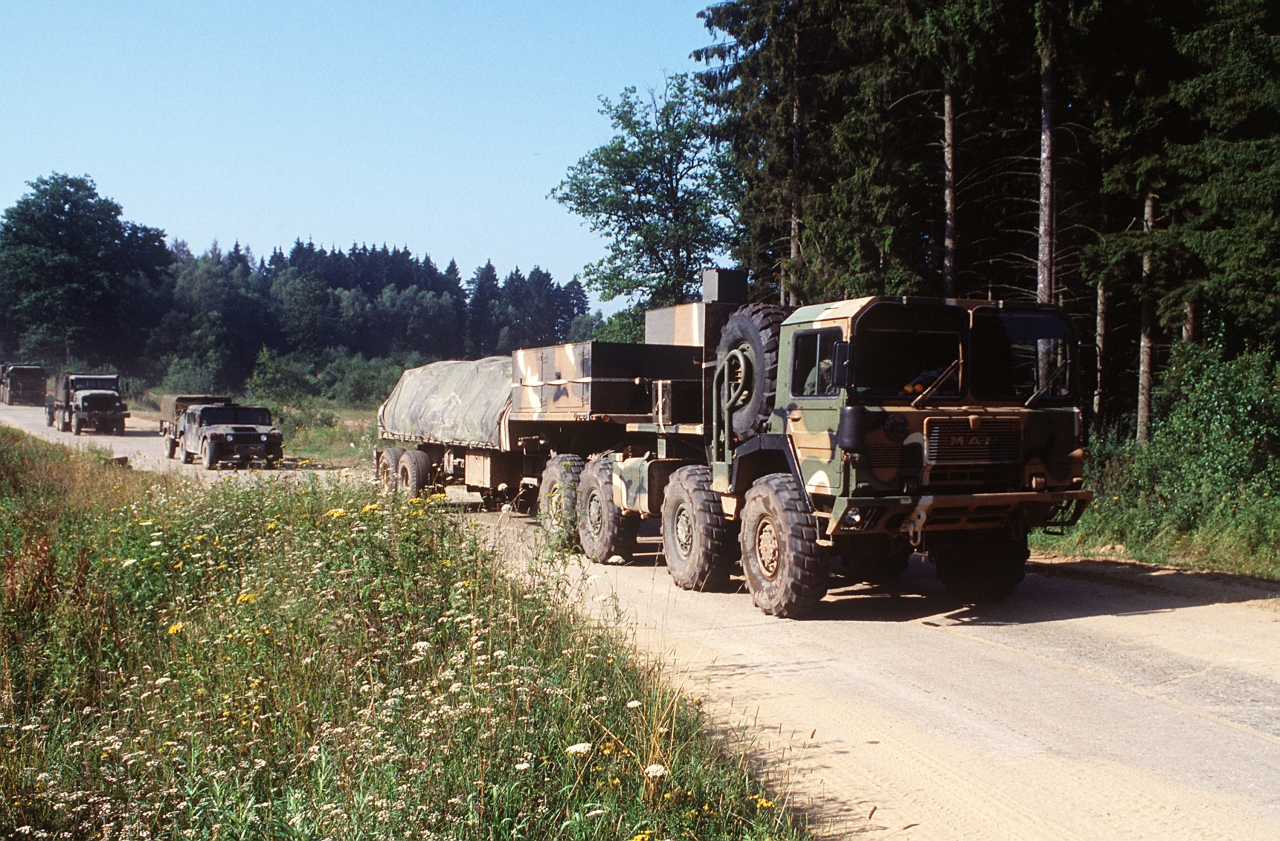
MAN Category 2 truck of US armed forces

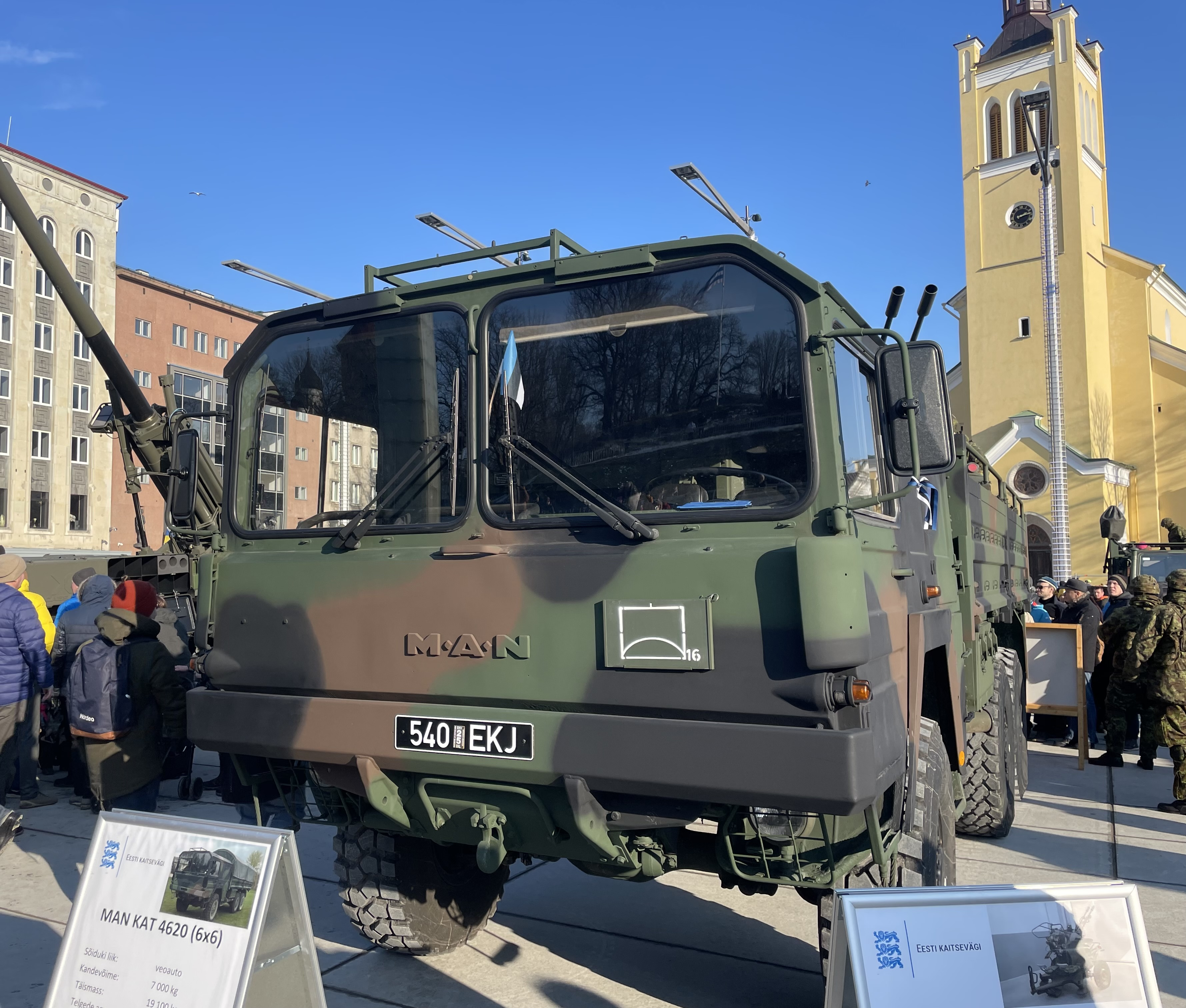
MAN Category 1 truck of Estonian Defence Forces

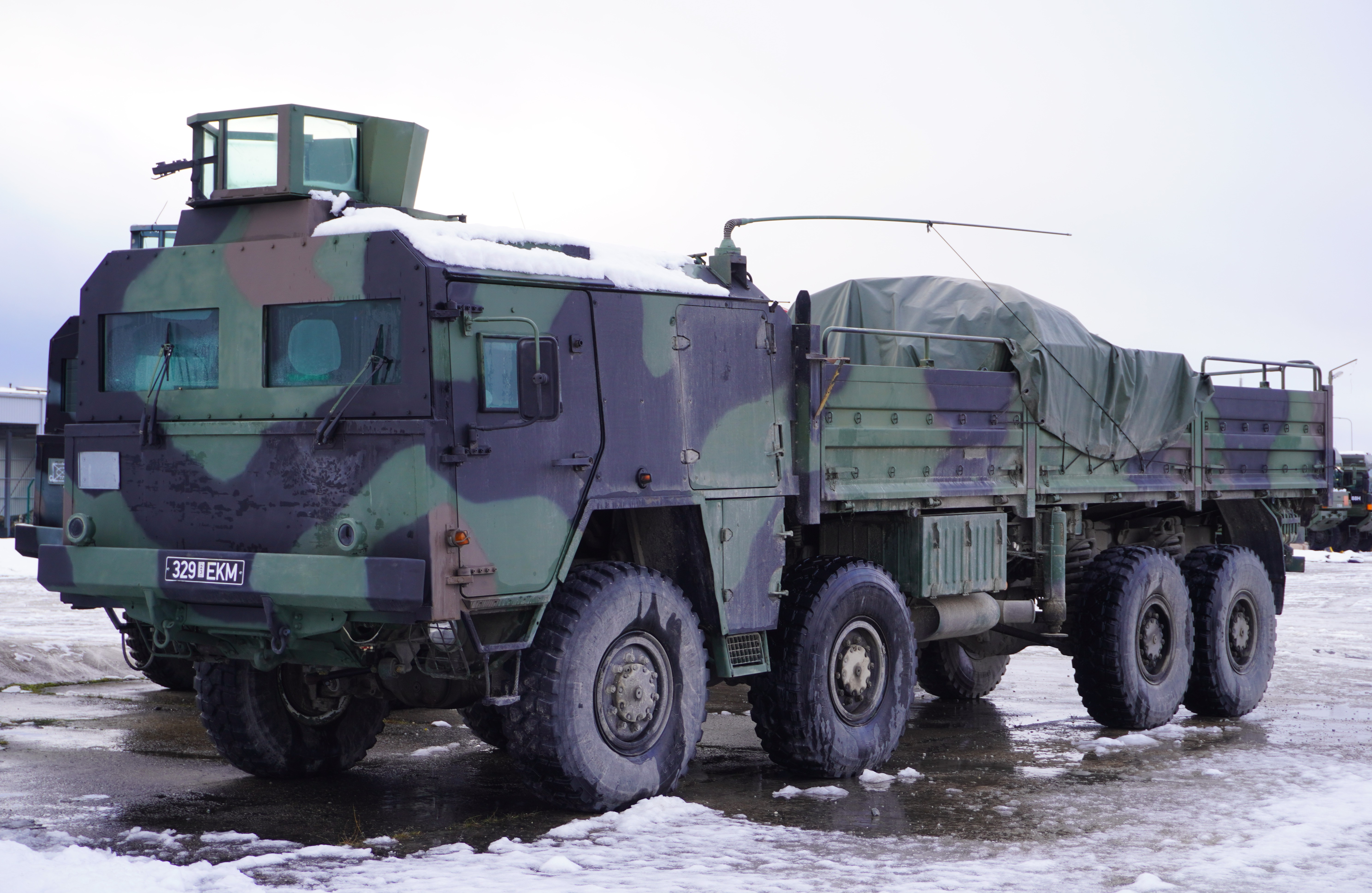
MAN Category 1 LKW 10 t mil gl (8×8) truck equipped with MSA (modularen Schutzausstattung, or modular protective equipment) used by the Estonian Defense Forces.

== Bundeswehr replacement ==
On 6 July 2017 Rheinmetall MAN Military Vehicles announced it had entered a framework agreement with the German Bundeswehr to supply 2271 MAN HX2 trucks under the Bundeswehr’s Unprotected Transport Vehicle (UTF) programme. UTF will replace the older Category 1 trucks. The contract award has a potential value of around EUR 900 million. An initial order for 558 trucks to an amount of around EUR 240 million was placed, including special tools and training support. Delivery was to take place during the 2018-2021 timeframe. RMMV announced on 12 June 2019 that the Bundeswehr had placed an order with the company for a second batch of unprotected transport vehicles. The order called for 252 trucks (161 5-tonne and 91 15-tonne) and was valued at EUR 92 million. The 252 vehicles ordered were delivered during 2019 and deliveries followed those of the original 558 trucks ordered at contract signing, the delivery timeline for these expedited. A further 60 trucks were ordered in November 2019, and the most recent order to date was announced in December 2019. This order calls for 1,000 trucks and is valued at EUR 382 million after taxes. Of the latest order, 675 trucks are 5,000 kg payload and the remaining 325 are 15,000 kg payload. Production of this latest order commenced in January 2020, with delivery to be complete by the end of the year.
