= Steelbro =

Australian heavy vehicle manufacturer

Steelbro NZ Limited
- Type: Privately held company
- Industry: Automotive industry in New Zealand
- Founded: 20 February 1878
- Founder: David & Joseph Steel
- Headquarters: Christchurch, New Zealand
- Area served: Worldwide
- Products: Sidelifters, semi-trailers, Intermodal freight transport equipment
- Website: www.steelbro.com

Steelbro Group is a heavy vehicle and crane manufacturer headquartered in Christchurch, New Zealand. In 2013 it owned the Steelbro, Transtank, Fuelgear and Freightquip businesses.

== History ==
Steelbro was founded in 1878 by brothers Joseph and David Steel and originally named the Steel Bros Canterbury Coach Factory in Lincoln Road, Addington, New Zealand. At this time the settlement of Christchurch was less than 30 years old.

The company initially manufactured horse drawn wagons, coaches, gigs and drays for the South Island of New Zealand. By 1895 the Steel brothers employed 22 staff.

In the early 1900s the company began making motor vehicle bodies, initially for commercial vehicles then private cars. The first of these were built on Albion chassis and then later Ford, Leyland and Bedford. This was followed by Triumph and Caterpillar and McCormick-Deering tractors. During the war years a number of military products were manufactured by the company to support the war effort, including tractors, barges, construction equipment and even including dummy aircraft for placement at a number of airports around the South Island of New Zealand. By 1952 the company employed about 100 staff.

In 1960 the company began mounting HIAB cranes to custom heavy trailers and truck bodies. Soon after becoming the first company outside of Sweden to manufacture HIAB loader cranes.

By 1967 the first Toyota Corona to be assembled in New Zealand came off the Steel Brothers' Motor Assemblies production line. Steel Brothers also assembled and exported Mark 4 Lotus Seven sports cars from 1973 to 1979.

In the mid-1970s the growth of intermodal freight transport was becoming significant in New Zealand, an island nation reliant on sea freight for both imported and exported goods. Soon after the company began to manufacture Sidelifters for the New Zealand and International markets. These were used to load and unload shipping containers for transport by road.

By the 1980s the company was manufacturing cars, truck bodies and heavy trailers for New Zealand, the Pacific, Southeast Asia and the United States and trading under the name of Steelbro. Along with the in-house designed heavy trailing equipment were agency brands for Putzmeister, HIAB and Johnston Roadsweepers.

In late 2001 Steelbro acquired Klaus Transportsysteme GmbH & Co. of Memmingen, Germany. Another Sidelifter manufacturer, known for pioneering a number of the early concepts used in the industry during the 1960s.

In 2003 the company began marketing a new type of container, designed to drop cargo such as coke directly from the bottom of the container into the hold of a ship.

In 2005, about 2000 litres of diesel fuel from Steelco's Sockburn plant leaked into the Heathcote River after a thief stole fuel and left the nozzle running on the ground.

In 2010 Steelbro was involved in a patent infringement suit with Swedish company Hammar Maskin. In 2011 the company received a patent for a new stabilizer design.

In 2013, the sidelifters division of Steelbro was placed in receivership, after which the NZ distribution of the equipment was taken over by TMC Trailers. The company's plant in Christchurch was closed. Steelbro Group moved Sidelifter manufacturing to its other facilities in Asia.

In 2014, the sidelifters division of Steelbro was purchased by Howard Porter and continues the operation of the global business

== Sidelifters ==
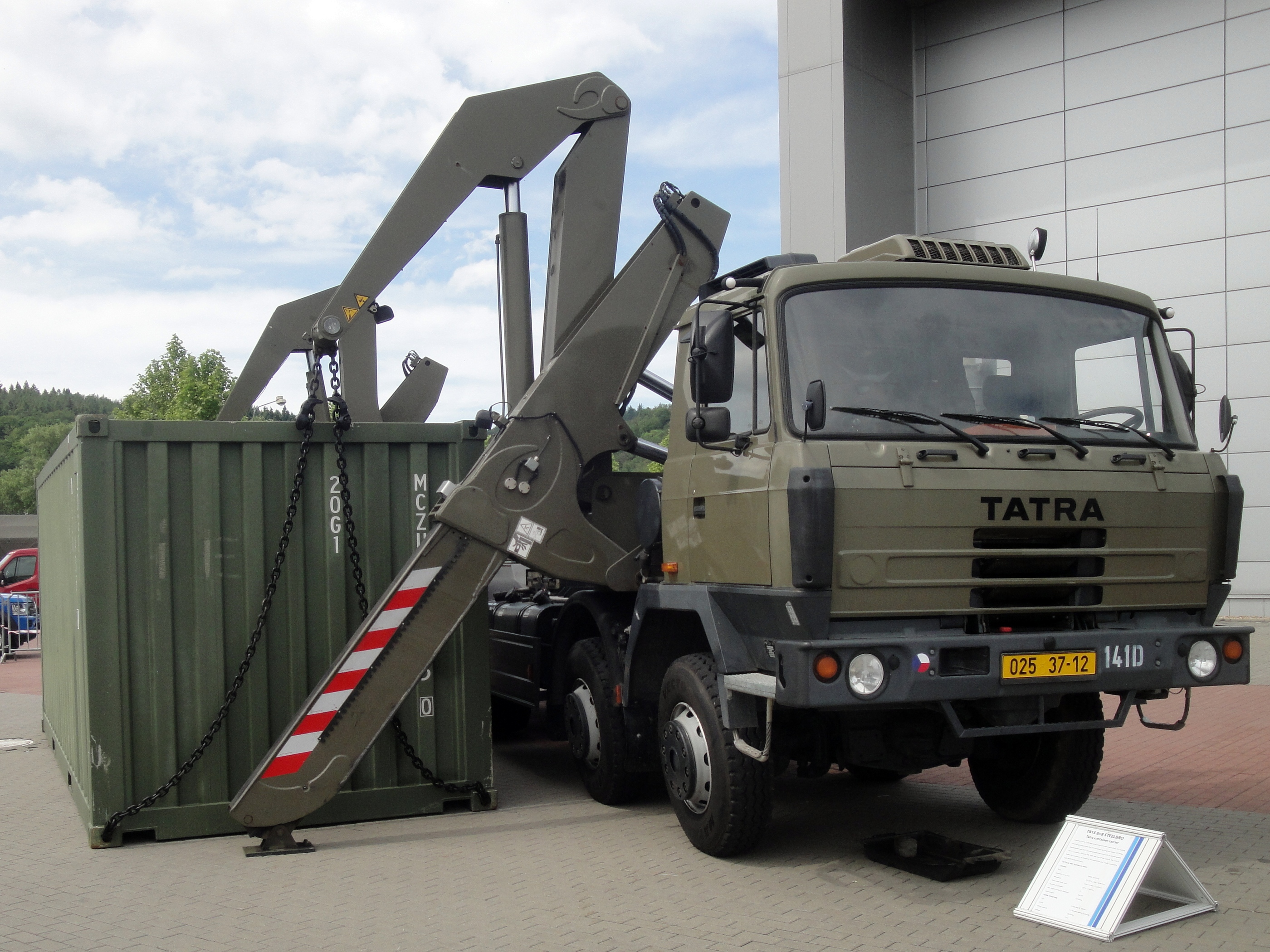
Steelbro sidelifter (Army of the Czech Republic)

Although Steelbro still manufacture customized semi-trailers, the main product manufactured is the cranes and trailer combined as a Sidelifter. The New Zealand manufacturer assembles components from a number of different international sources in the Christchurch factory before shipping to customers worldwide.

The capacities of variants range from 4 tonnes to 45 tonnes. The most common models are rated to a maximum of 36 tonnes.

A range of crane models are offered by the company with model numbers reflecting the capacity of the crane pair and design variant. For example, the SB360 is the first generation design of Sidelifter cranes capable of lifting a maximum 36 tonne as a pair. Likewise the SB362 is a third generation design with the same maximum lift capacity.
