= Roller container =

Type of container that can be carried by trucks

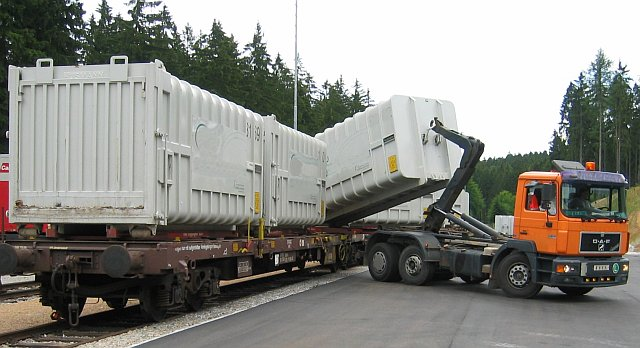
ACTS loading process

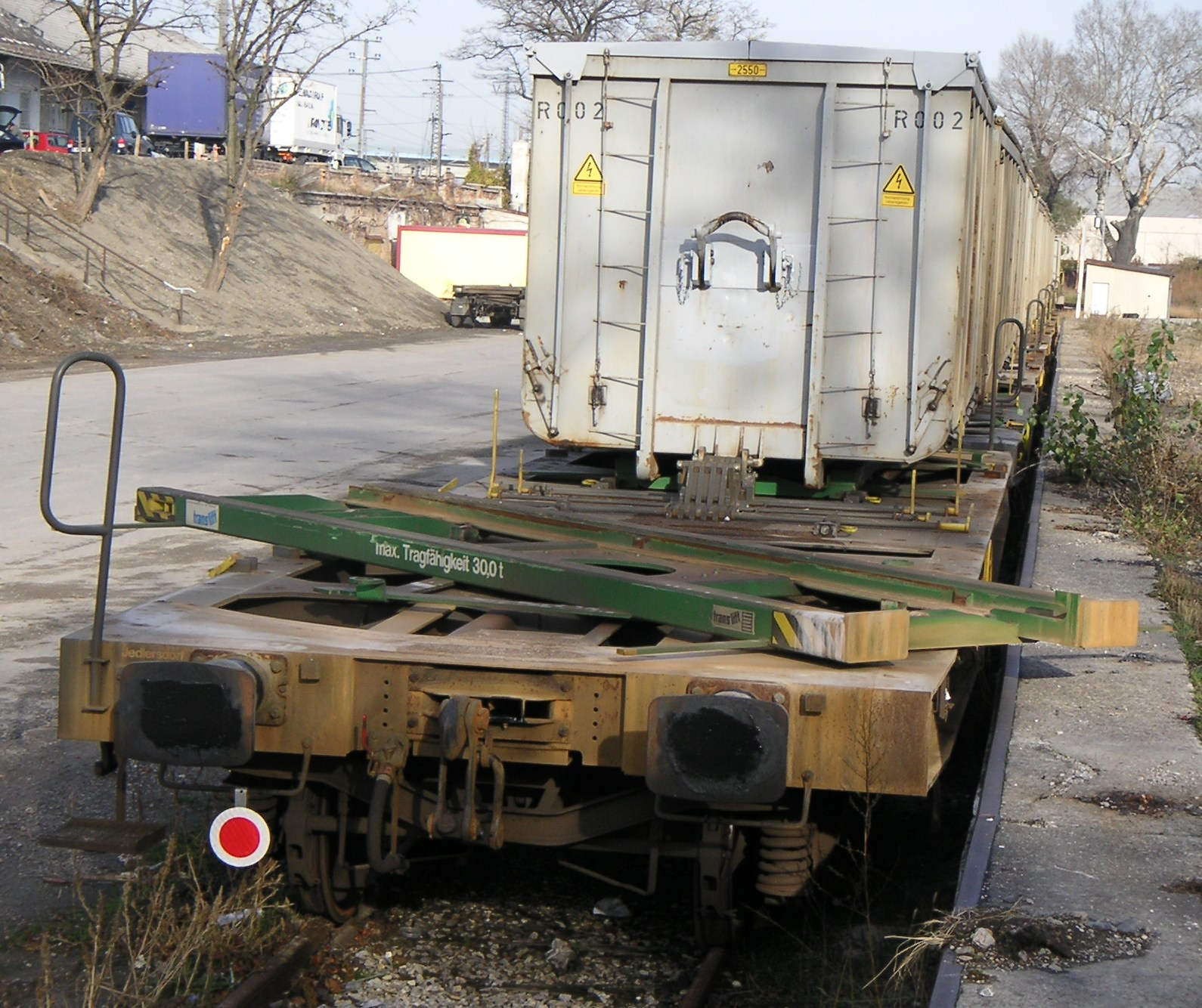
ACTS transport frame in loading position

A roller container is a container type that can be carried by trucks to be pushed to ground level by help of a hook and level arm with the container possibly sliding on steel roller wheels.

Its original usage was in the collection of bulk waste resulting in the creation of the DIN standards to be initiated by city cleaning companies. An additional part defines a transport frame mounted on specialized rail cars that allows easy intermodal transport for these container types.

Another important area is in the containerization of firefighting equipment used as swap body containers of fire trucks.

== Etymology ==
The term "roller container" has been introduced in the English summary of the DIN standards that refer to the prominent feature of steel wheels - such wide wheels are commonly known in English as rollers. It does also refer to the verb "to roll" which has the same meaning in German - the particle "ab-" in German "abroll container" designates downward/pushback operations so that the German Abrollcontainer is sometimes translated to English as "roll-off container".

The DIN standard uses the German term Abrollbehälter where the generic Germanic "behälter" has replaced the Romanic "container" - the latter is more associated with transport containers in the German language so that the ACTS designation has picked up Abrollcontainer instead of the synonymous Abrollbehälter. With Abrollcontainer associated to transport systems the various Abrollbehälter types are usually denoting firefighting equipment. In British English the firefighting containers are generically called "demountable pod" or just "pod" for example "foam pod" and while being a generic term these are universally roller containers as well.

There is an additional term "hooklift container" that is related to the common designation of the hoist gear on trucks used for roller containers to be called "hook lift". This has influenced languages like Dutch where the truck is called haakarmvoertuig (hook arm vehicle) and the container being a haakarmbak (hook arm pod). These terms refer to the level arm that matches with the grip hook on the container to lift it from the ground. The term hooklift container may refer to any container type with an additional hook bar which does not necessarily include roller wheels - this includes the NATO standard STANAG 2413 variations of 20' ISO containers having an additional hook bar.

== History ==
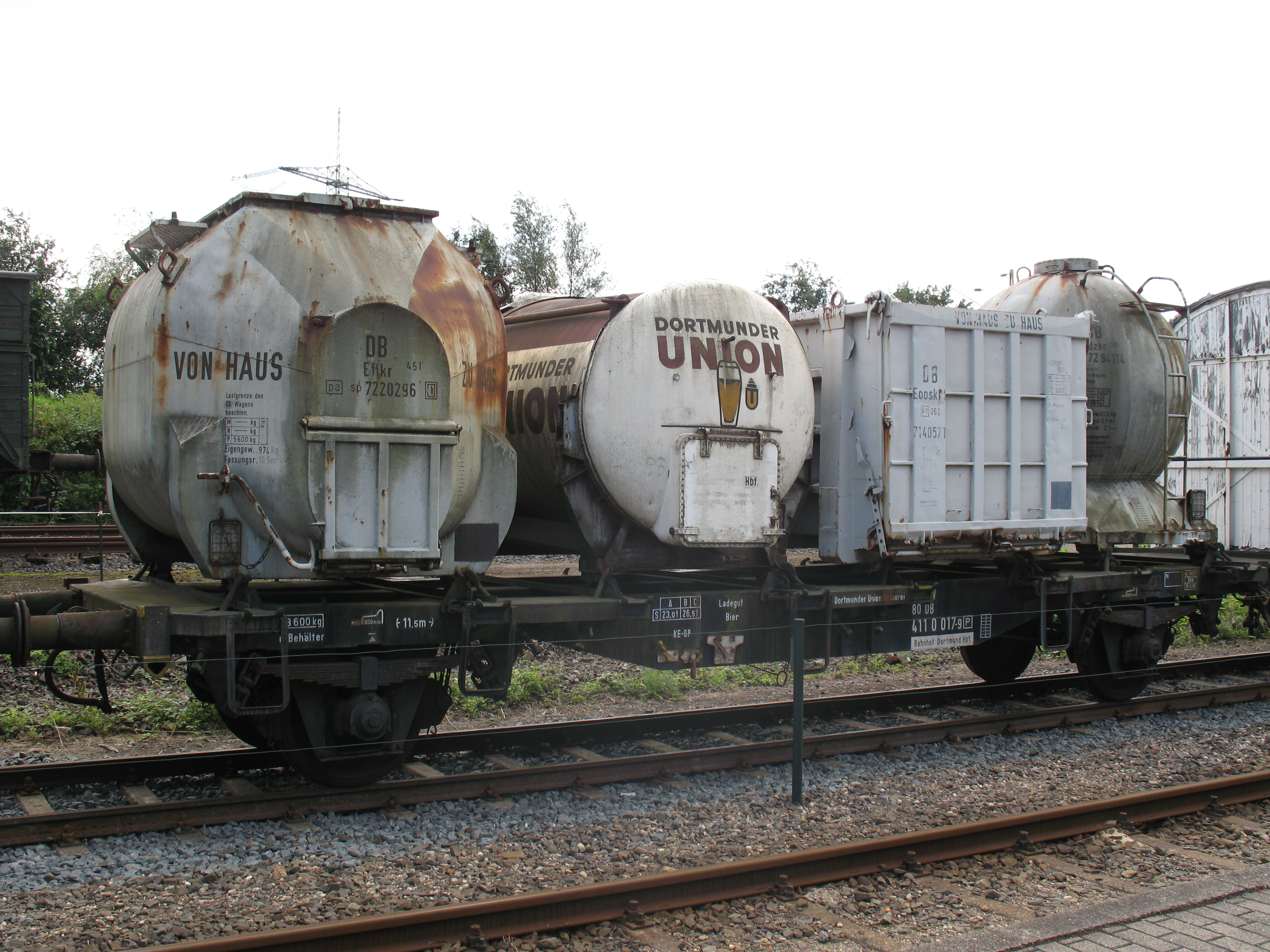
predecessor-type BT flatcar ("Behältertragwagen") with removable vessels and a removable open-top container ("von haus zu haus") of type Eooskrt

Solutions for intermodal transport containers in road and rail transport already appeared in the 1930s. One of the systems was used since 1934 in the Netherlands to carry waste transportation and consumer goods. These "Laadkisten" had a permissible gross mass of 3,000 kg (6,600 lb) and dimensions of 2.5 m × 2 m × 2 m (8 ft 2 3/8 in × 6 ft 6 3/4 in × 6 ft 6 3/4 in). Reloading held by dragging rope winch tow car.

After World War II that system was used for transports between Switzerland and the Netherlands. On 14–23 April 1951 in Zurich Tiefenbrunnen under the auspices of the Club «Museum of Transport, Switzerland, Swiss Transportation" and Bureau International des Containers "(BIC) held demonstrations container systems aim to select the best solution for Western Europe. There were representatives Belgium, France, the Netherlands, Germany, Switzerland, Sweden, Great Britain, Italy and the USA. The result of this meeting had been the first after World War II European standard UIC 590, also known as "Pa-Behälter" (porteur-aménagé-Behälter). This system has been implemented in Denmark, Belgium, the Netherlands, Luxembourg, West Germany, Switzerland and Sweden. In Germany it was widely marketed as the "haus zu haus" (house to house) transport system which did include a variety of pod types.

Along with the gradual popularization of large container type ISO (first seen in Europe in 1966), the "Pa-Behälter" system fell out of use and it was subsequently withdrawn by the railways (no new containers produced after 1975, scrapped in the 2000s). The transport of waste containers was moved completely to road transportation in the 1970s. Previously the open-top middle-sized container Eoskrt of the "haus zu haus" series was widely used for waste transport by rail. It could be moved on four small wheels on to the flat car fitting into comparably narrow guide rails that were mounted on them. These early roll containers types had standard steel wheels of 75 mm in width with a diameter size of 200 mm. The axle track was 1400 mm across and the wheel base 1950 mm at length. Lashing eyelets are attached to every wheel case allowing to move and lock the container in place.

== Standardization ==
Roller containers have been standardized in DIN 30722 by the Municipal Services Standards Committee (German Normenausschuss Kommunale Technik / NKT). The first parts are subdivisions of different weight classes (part 1 up to 26 tonnes [28.7 short tons; 25.6 long tons], part 2 up to 32 tonnes [35.3 short tons; 31.5 long tons], part 3 up to 16 tonnes [17.6 short tons; 15.7 long tons]) that had been first published in April 1993 and the latest revision being published in February 2007. The part 4 of the standard series covers the intermodal transport between rail and road with the issue of July 1994 being still current.

The DIN roller containers have a hook that is directed 45° upwards with the handle bar positioned at a height of 1,570 mm (61.81 in). The roller wheels have an inner distance of 1,560 mm (61.42 in) and an outer distance of 2,160 mm (85.04 in). The width of the containers does mostly follow intermodal shipping containers and there are undercarriage frames available for twenty-foot containers to be handled as a roller container. The length of DIN roller containers is standardized in steps of 250 mm (9.84 in) from an overall length of 4,000 to 7,000 mm (13 ft 1 in to 23 ft 0 in). The height has not been standardized and roller containers are commonly not used for stacking.

The NATO standard STANAG 2413 "demountable load carrying platforms (dlcp/flatracks)" references the DIN 30722 for the definition of the "hookbar". The LHS rollers and ISO container twistlock pockets are optional in STANAG 2413 - the LHS designation references the Load Handling System (German Hakenladesystem / hook load system) derived from the DIN roller containers in use for firefighting equipment.

== Container types and applications ==
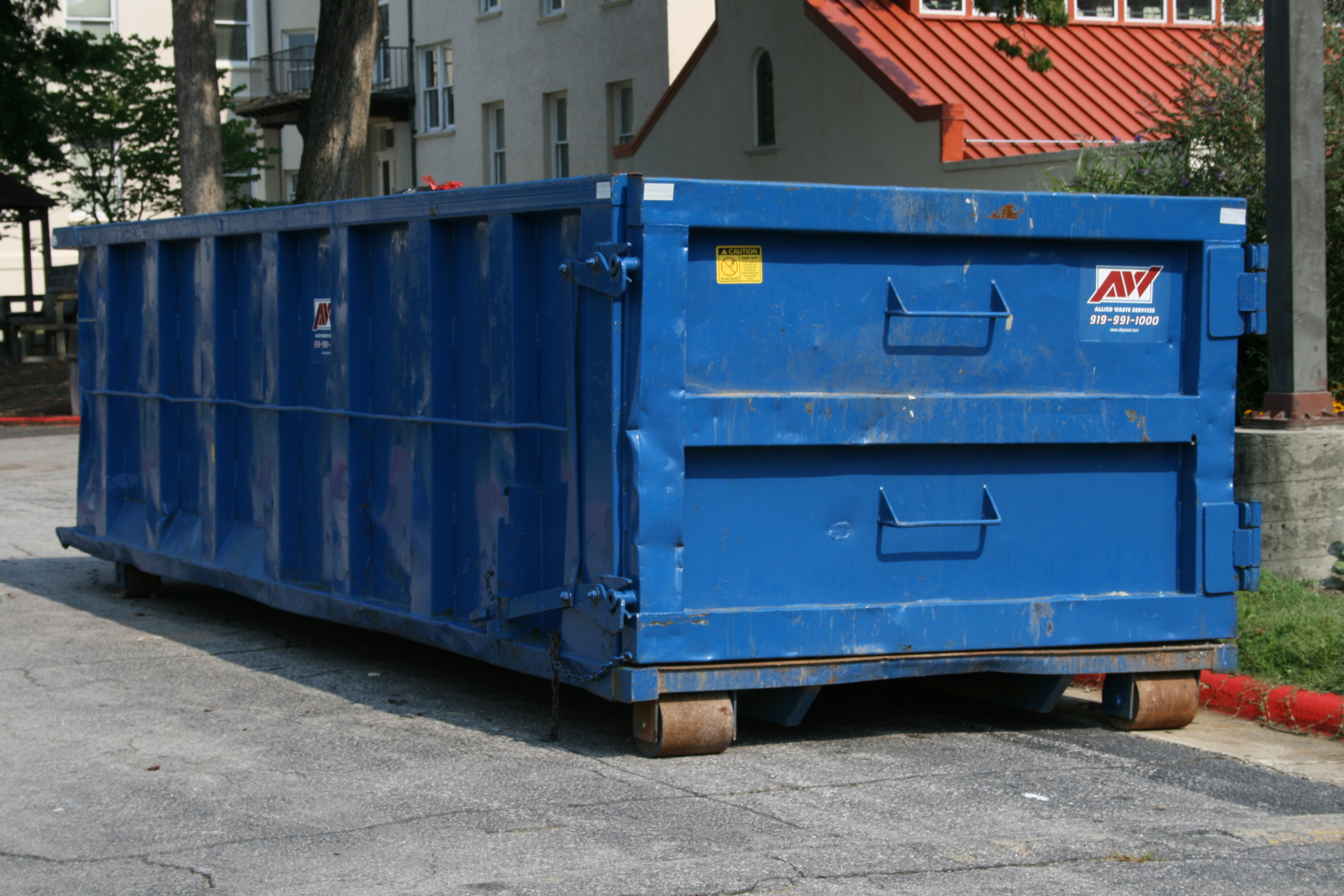
Low height blue Allied Waste rolloff container

The roller containers come in a larger variety for specific usages. For bulk waste a common type has additional impermeable doors on one side. There are low height containers that allow easy dumping of green care waste. There are squeeze containers that compress the garbage. Roller containers for construction waste need additional stability. The DIN standard does not define the height nor most of the other sizes - it concentrates on the hook for lifting the container and the wheels that allow sliding on the ground.

According to Marrel they have invented hooklift trucks marketing them since 1969 in the USA. There have been various heights and sizes of the hook with the ACTS roller container system standardizing on 1,570 mm (61.81 in) (rounded to 61.75 inches or 1,568 millimetres for the US market at Stellar Industries). Hook heights of 54" and 36" are also in common use.

=== ACTS intermodal transport system ===
The ACTS (from German Abrollcontainer Transportsystem / roller container transport system) offers a loading principle from a roller container truck directly on to a rail car. There is no additional installation required for the process as the level arm of the truck can push the container on to a transport frame that is mounted on the rail car. The transport frame consists of two U-profile rail bars and a central pivot - this allows the frame to swing out for loading and to swing back to be parallel with the rail car for distance travel by rail.

The ACTS found wider usage first in Switzerland where rail transport to remote villages is often easier than running large trucks through narrow streets. Rail transport of roller containers is now prevalent in German-speaking countries and neighbouring countries like the Netherlands and the Czech Republic.

=== Containerized firefighting equipment ===
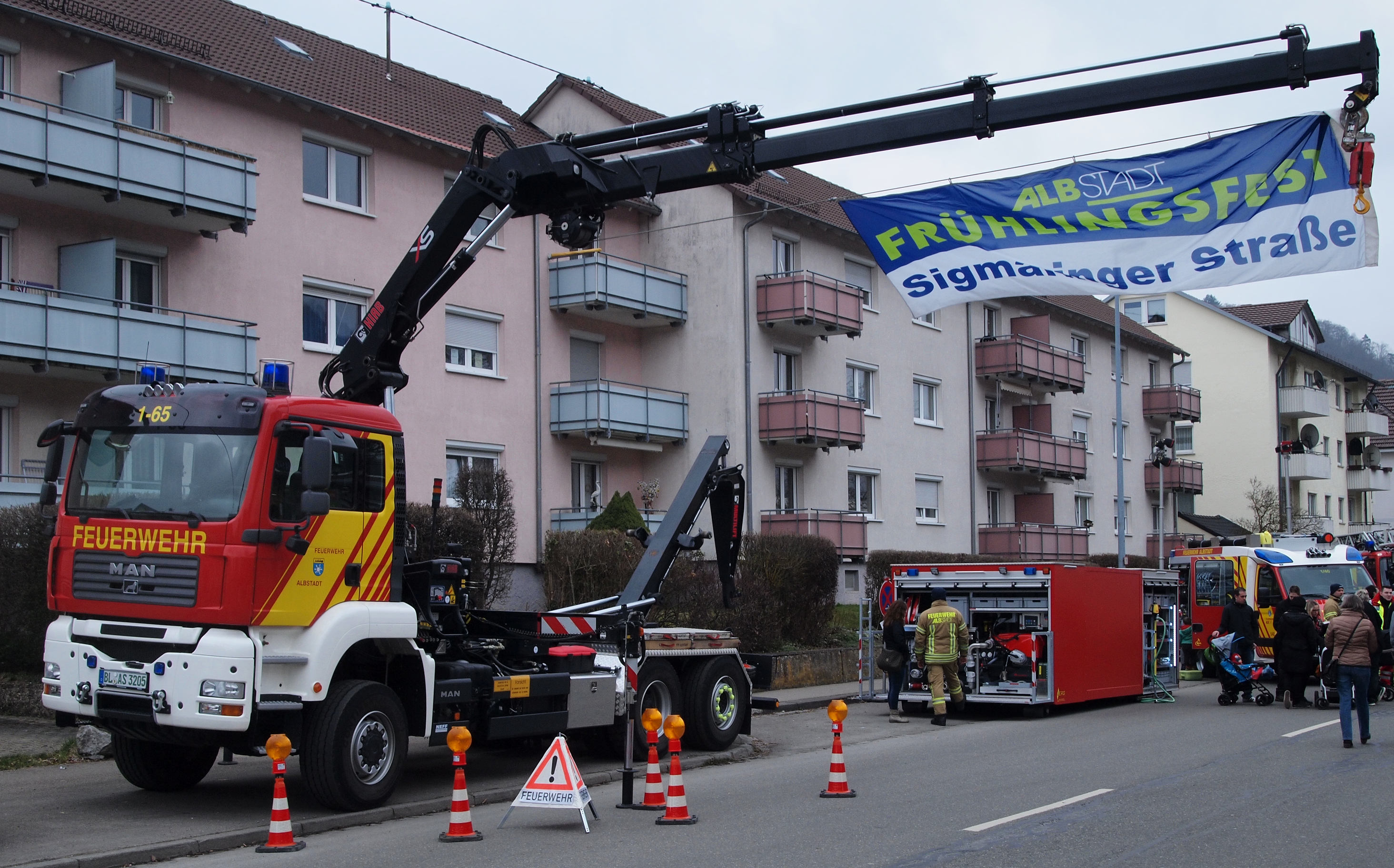
A Feuerwehr Wechselladerfahrzeug crane with deployed pumping roller container

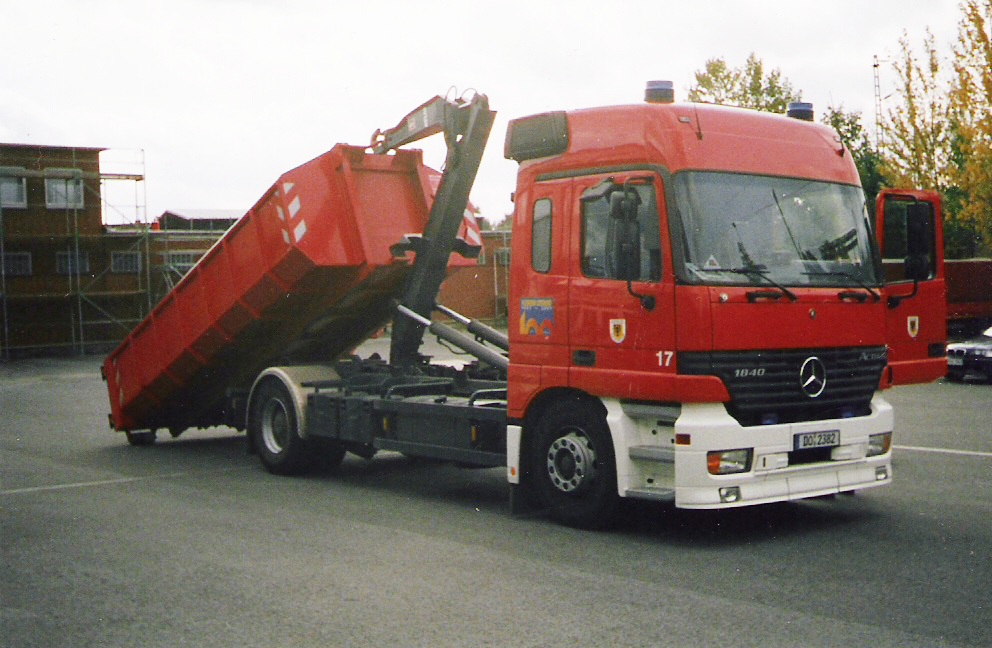
WLF standard vehicle in Germany

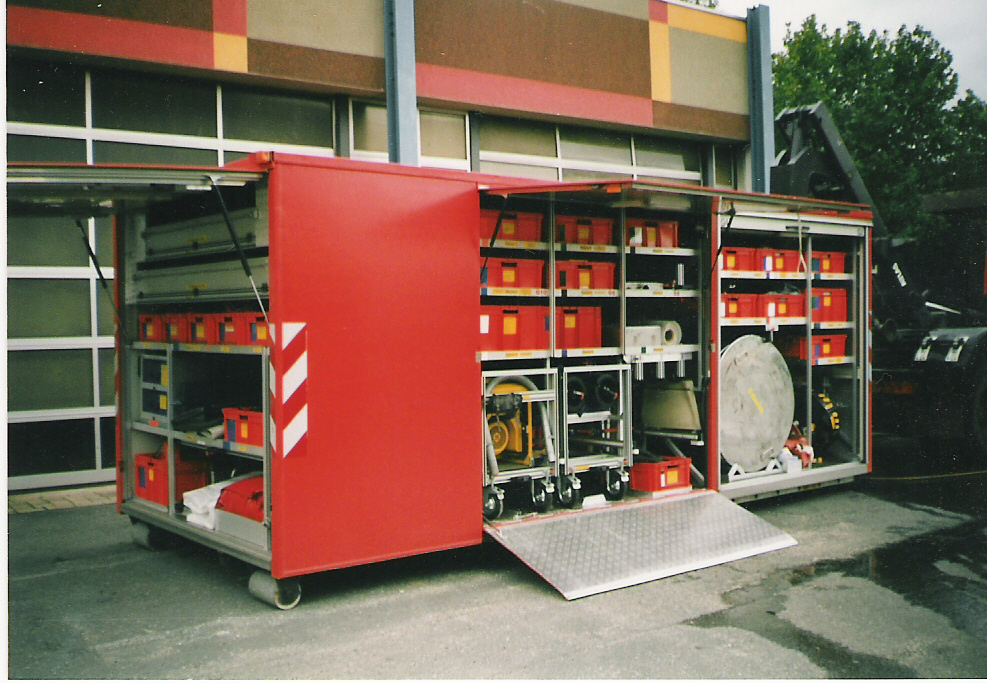
Abrollbehälter Gefahrgut

The roller container standards have become the basis of containerized firefighting equipment throughout Europe. The permanent mounting of equipment creates a large number of specialized fire trucks while containerization allows the use of only one transport truck with a level arm - in Germany it is called WLF (German Wechselladerfahrzeug / swap loader vehicle). In practical usage there are lighter specialized fire trucks for everyday usage while larger fire and catastrophic situations can be handled by using WLF in a shuttle operation bringing as much equipment to the scene as needed.

The containers come in a great variety with national regulations to control common types, for example in Germany one may find

- AB-Dekon (Abrollbehälter Umweltschutz/Strahlenschutz/Gefahrgut) contains steam cleaners and shower compartments
- AB-MANV (Abrollbehälter Massenanfall von Verletzten) is mainly a stretcher carrier for a large number of injured
- AB-Nachschub (Abrollbehälter Rüst) contains construction tools to handle complex scenes
- AB-Schaum (Abrollbehälter Wasser/Schaum) a tank for remote areas with insufficient water supply (in the UK Foam Distribution Unit / foam pod)
- AB-ELW (Abrollbehälter Einsatzleitung) coordination center where multiple ELW may be combined to handle larger scenes (in the UK Command and Control Unit / command pod)
- AB-Schlauch (Abrollbehälter Schlauch) water hose extensions to attach to water supply in a larger distance (in the UK Hose Laying Unit / hose pod)

For the most part the replacement of older fire trucks takes the form of new AB units in Germany. The AB units may be built from standard containers with equipment installed from different suppliers as required by the fire department. The WLF loader vehicle can be purchased independently with the availability of a wide variety of trucks on the market (that are not originally designed for firefighting) - the trucks are sent to specialized workshops that can convert them to WLF fire trucks by adding a hook lift, siren and communications. The AB units may be used far longer than the WLF trucks as the latter can be exchanged independently - this makes maintenance cheaper especially for special equipment that is only rarely needed. Additionally some firefighting equipment like the decontamination pod have advantages for military conversion dispatching them by standard NATO container transport.

=== Military ===
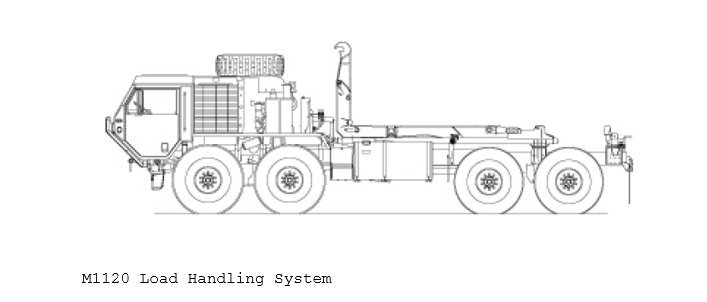
M1120 HEMTT LHS swap loader vehicle

In the US the Heavy Expanded Mobility Tactical Truck (HEMTT) was produced in a version with a hooklift hoist gear named Load Handling System (LHS). The M1120 HEMTT LHS is the basis of the Palletized Load System using a flatbed platform to be mounted under ISO containers as a Container Handling Unit (CHU). This allows containers to be unloaded without the help of a forklift. Current NATO agreements require PLS to maintain interoperability with comparable British, German and French systems through the use of a common flatrack.

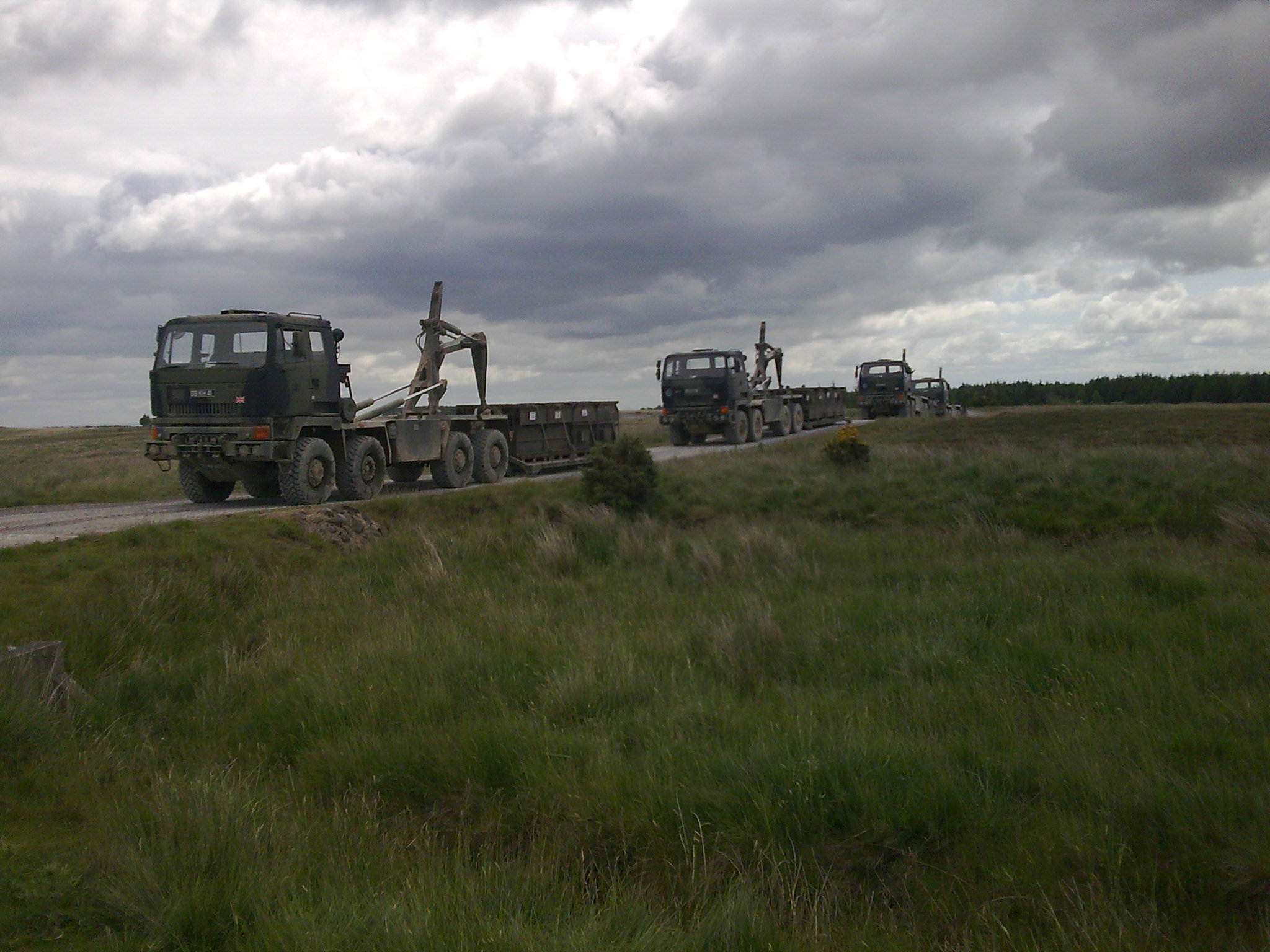
British Army DROPS vehicles with flat-racks

The British Army has developed the Demountable Rack Offload and Pickup System (DROPS) using the Medium Mobility Load Carrier (MMLC) as an all-terrain truck with a hook loader system. As in the Palletized Load System a flatrack can be used to transport ISO containers. After an evolutionary step with the Improved Medium Mobility Load Carrier (IMMLC) the British Army is now transitioning the Enhanced Pallet Load System (EPLS). In the ELPS there is a different Container Handling Unit that is not put under the container but it uses an H Frame that fits into the corner locks of an ISO container on the back side.

== Disadvantages ==
Although roller containers are very easy to load/unload they do have some problems. The steel rollers that contact the ground can cause damage to asphalt pavement, a concrete surface is more suitable. The angle that the container is tilted can cause loads to move if they are not secured. A swap body may be used where the container needs to be kept level.

== See also ==
- CargoBeamer for moving containers to a train sideways
- Dumpster
- Intermodal container
- Modalohr rail car turning platform for shipping containers
- Roll-off (dumpster), special roll-off trucks for open-top containers
- Sidelifter for bringing containers to ground level
- Swap body trucks that are not lowered to ground level
- Tank chassis
