= Knuckle boom crane =

Crane type

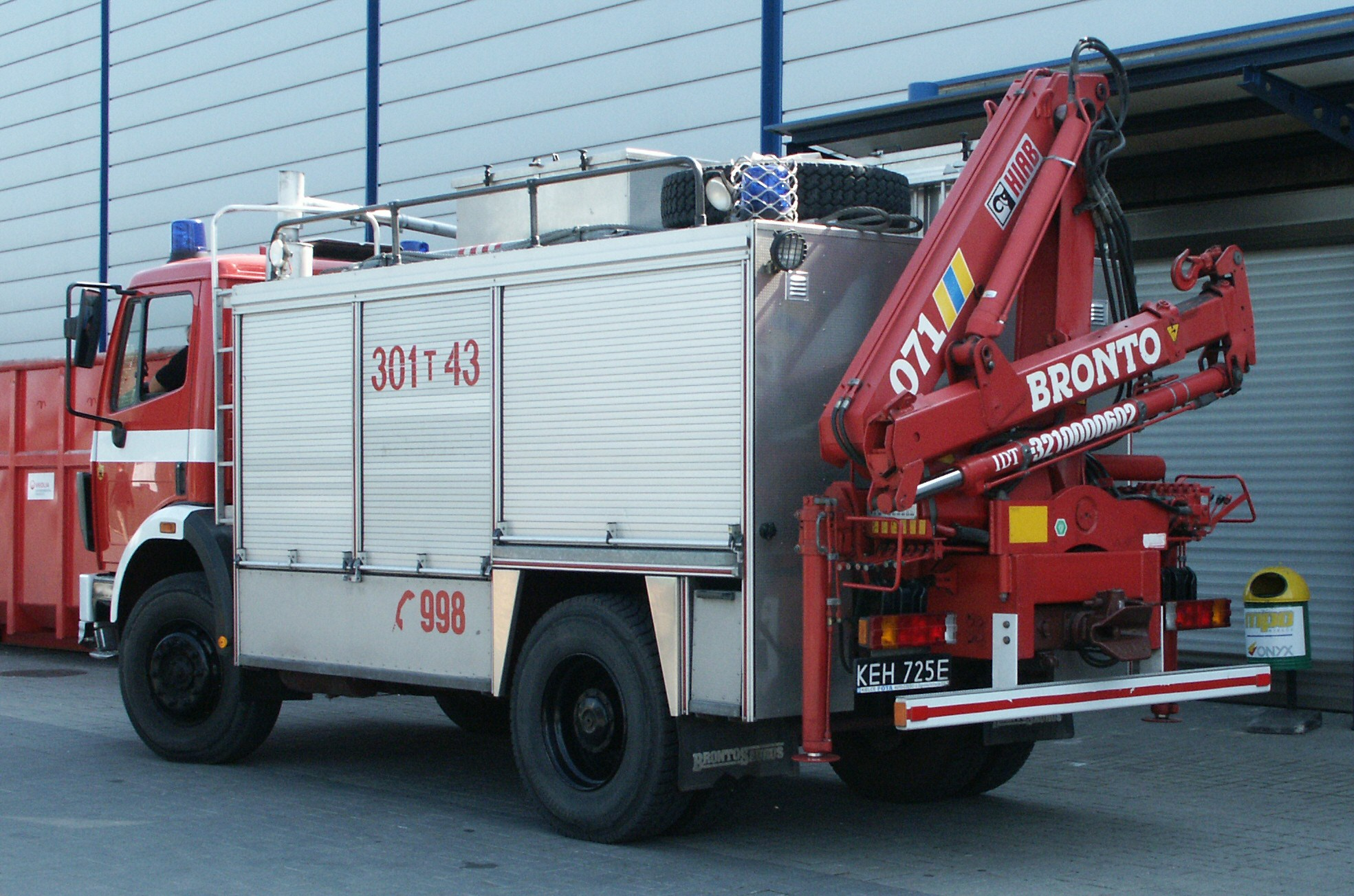
Fire appliance, with rear knuckle boom HIAB crane, folded for transport.

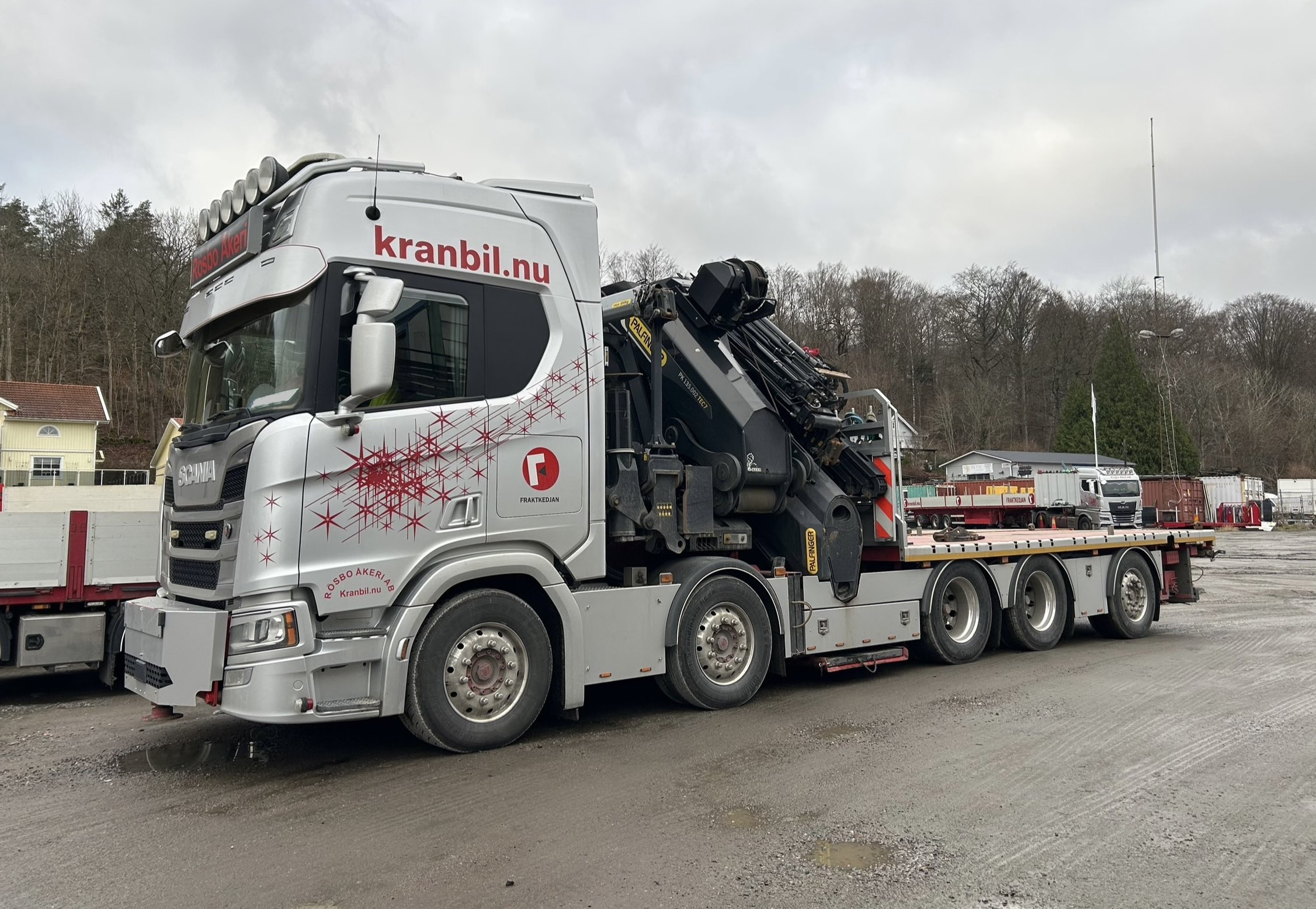
A Scania R540 with a 135 Tonne/Meter Palfinger crane (folded) in Sweden.

A knuckle boom crane, also knowns as an articulating boom crane, is a kind of standard crane whose boom articulates at a 'knuckle', letting it fold back like a finger. This provides a compact size for storage and manoeuvring. Other knuckle booms are typical in North American excavators, which usually have two articulations like an index finger. Most often seen are hydraulically-actuated knuckle booms.

== Synopsis ==
Knuckle boom cranes have become very common on offshore vessels for such purposes as fishing as less of the deck space is blocked by the crane. Disadvantages of this crane type are the higher power demand and increased maintenance requirement due to the increased number of moving parts.

Knuckle boom crane arms are much lighter than boom truck cranes, and they are designed to allow for more payloads to be carried on the back of the truck that it is mounted on. The majority of them are mounted behind the cab and leave the entire bed of the truck empty.

The cranes come with different types of control systems, such as: stand up, control from the ground, seat control, or radio remote control. The radio remote systems now can start the crane as well as run the crane. Currently, they come equipped with a computer readout system that immediately gives readouts from the system if the crane is overloaded or not.

The technical standard in the US is known as ASME B30.22.

== Notable manufacturers ==
- Hiab
- Palfinger
- Fassi Crane
- Atlas Cranes GMBH
- Komatsu Limited
- Amco Veba

== Gallery ==
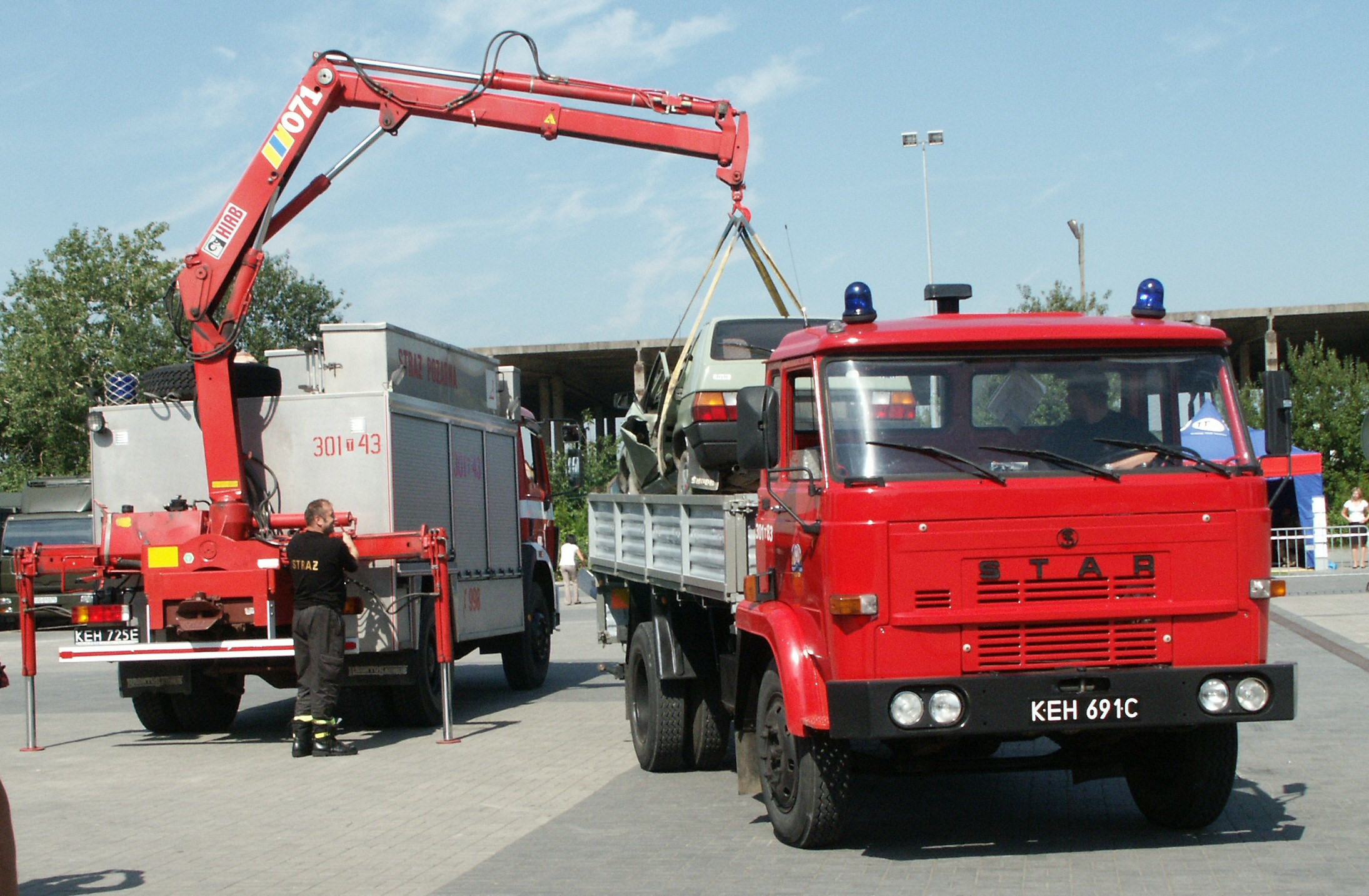
Same crane, extended to recover a damaged car.

== See also ==
- Loader Crane
