= Swap body =

Freight container

A swap body, exchangeable container or interchangeable unit, is one of the types of standard freight containers for road and rail transport.

Based on and very similar to the more widespread shipping containers (ISO containers), swap bodies normally have the same external dimensions for the bottom corner fittings as ISO shipping containers so that they can be placed on the same kinds of trucks, trailers and railroad cars designed for shipping containers. However, ISO containers inner dimensions (2.33 m wide) are just a few centimetres too short to accommodate European-pool pallets (0.8 m × 1.2 m or 31.5 in × 47.2 in) without leaving much empty space. To optimise the carriage of pallets, wide bodies are often scaled to the maximum width allowed for standard road trucks and railroad cars and to a different length without leaving empty space.

On the other hand, swap bodies do not have upper corner fittings, are not stackable and must be lifted by the bottom frame. Thus, they require special handling when transported by rail and are unsuitable for ship-based overseas transportation.

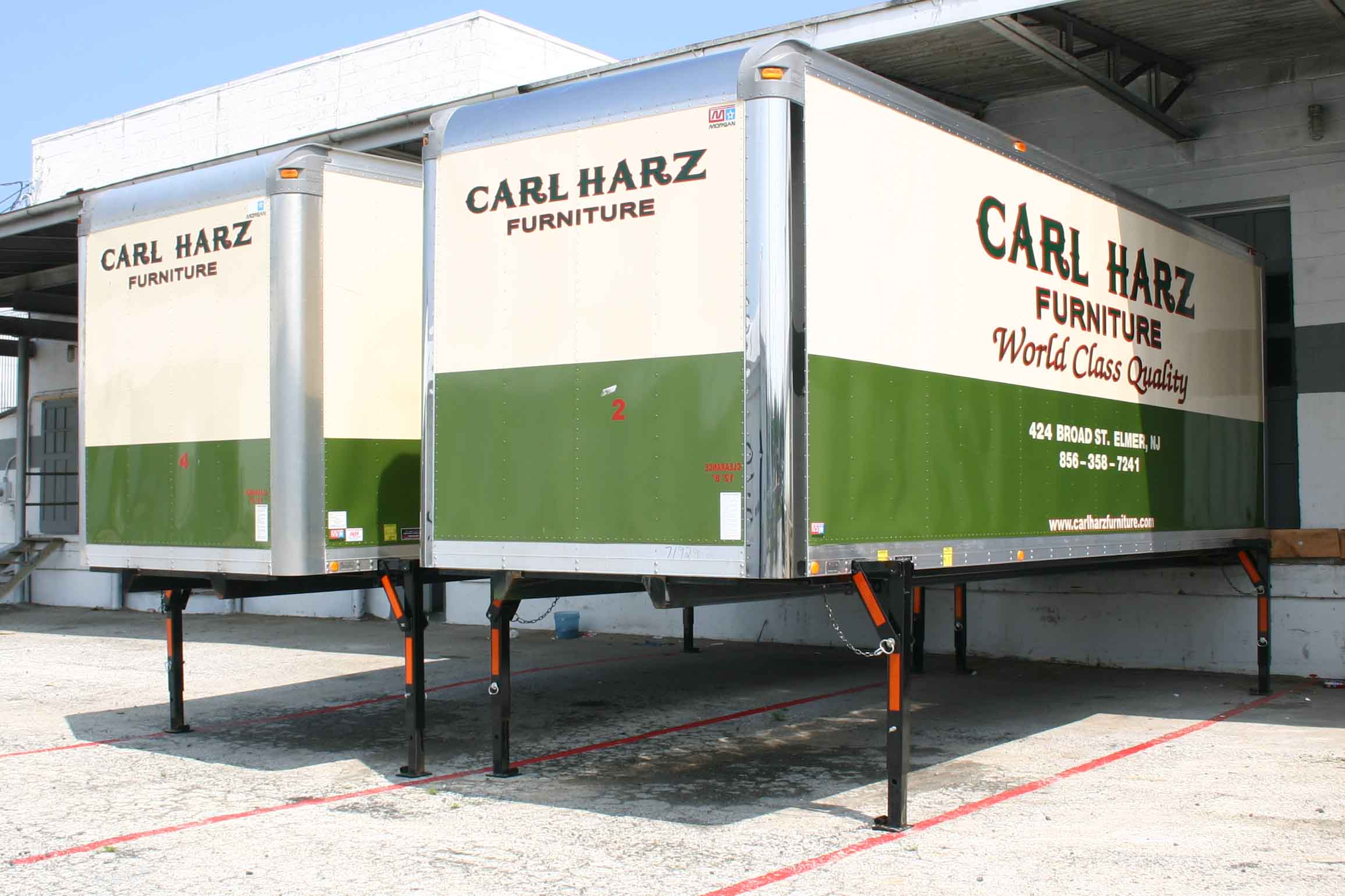
Swap Body or Demountable Body; notice the four legs deployed to support the frame (see text)

Swap bodies take advantage of the large number of trailers used to carry standard ISO containers. The design of swap bodies and roller containers is optimized to minimize empty weight, saving on trucking fuel cost (less dead weight to be transported) and the cost of building reloading terminals.

Due to security concerns, an increasing number of swap bodies have a hard surface instead of curtains and tarpaulins.

Swap bodies are typically more expensive than equivalent payload ISO containers. This is because the ISO containers used in Europe are typically manufactured in China, whereas swap bodies are made in Europe (central Europe and the UK). This extra cost is offset by the lighter weight of the body and increased cargo capacity, resulting in fuel savings during transport.

Many swap bodies are fitted with four up-folding legs under their frame. These legs make it possible to change, or swap, their body from one carriage to another, or to leave the swap body at a destination, without using extra equipment such as a crane or hoist.

Special swap bodies may have more doors or sliding panels than ordinary hard boxes for trucks, railroad cars, or sea containers. This feature makes unloading and loading faster and easier.

Many swap bodies are fitted with keyhole tracks. These secure a range of extras such as shoring bars and cargo nets to extend its uses in various applications. Recently a second flooring using folding shelves has been used to aid postal companies.

Special steel frames or racks are available in certain container ships and container marshalling yards to hoist swap bodies from topside.

All swap bodies are subject to extensive non-destructive (in most cases) testing, some in-house others not, regulated by certifying authorities.

Basic standardization is set with Euronorms EN 283, EN 284 and EN 452 for construction and design, as well as EN 13044 for marking and identification. The panel responsible for developing standards is CEN/TC 119. The outcome of this panel has not yet provided any contribution to automation, as handling the swap bodies is a traditional haulage business with truck drivers involved.

Swap bodies in Europe are all manufactured to a DIN standard of DIN EN 283. In the United States there are no standard sizes. Demountable Concepts, Inc., however maintains compliance will all applicable cargo securement standards for its swap bodies.

== See also ==
- CargoBeamer
- Containerization
- Containerlift
- Roller container
- Semi-trailer
- Sidelifter
- Tank chassis
- ULD
