= Municipal Services Standards Committee =

The Municipal Services Standards Committee (NKT) of the German Institute for Standardization (DIN) is responsible for standardisation in the field of waste management and city cleaning. It chairs a number of European standardisation committees (CEN) and it issues specifications on technical and logistical aspects in waste handling, road cleaning, highway maintenance and winter service.

== Organization ==
The full title is "Normenausschuss Kommunale Technik" (standards committee on municipal engineering) "im DIN Deutsches Institut für Normung e. V" (in the DIN German institute for standardisation). The NKT was founded on 26. November 1968 in Frankfurt on the initiative of the municipal authority associations like the "VKS im VKU" (full title "Verband kommunaler Abfallwirtschaft und Stadtreinigung" / association on municipal waste management and city cleaning) and the "BDE" (full title "Bundesverband der Deutschen Entsorgungs-, Wasser- und Rohstoffwirtschaft" / federal association of German waste management, water management and natural resources).

The current organization is substructured in five departements (Fachbereich 1 „Grundlagen“ - basics; Fachbereich 2 „Behälter“ - containers; Fachbereich 3 „Fahrzeuge“ - vehicles; Fachbereich 4 „Anlagen“ - facilities; Fachbereich 5 „EDV“ - electronic data processing) running 29 projects. There are 106 national standards and 9 recommendations created by the NKT. The NKT is member of 31 national standardization boards, 10 European standardization boards and 2 international standardization boards.

== Standards ==
- DIN 30722 on roller containers also used in containerized firefighting equipment
- DIN EN 840 on mobile waste and recycling containers
- DIN EN 12574 on stationary waste containers
