= Containerlift =

UK freight transport company

- Industry: Freight transport

Containerlift is a freight transport company in the United Kingdom. Containerlift introduced the sidelifter transport concept widely used in Australia and New Zealand to the UK.

The company has since expanded into general container movement, using sidelifters, conventional road transport, rail transport and logistics and consultancy. It has expanded abroad to sites in France, The Netherlands and Ireland.

== Development ==
In September 2005 Containerlift introduced a pioneering new service transporting containers between the deep water port of Thamesport and destinations in London, using an intermediate scheduled rail service to Willesden with partner DB Cargo UK.

This service is unusual in the fact that modern rail based container transport has been traditionally done over much longer distances, marking a shift in the economies involved, when considering traffic congestion, fuel prices and driver shortages.

== Operating centres ==
- Birmingham
- Bristol
- Dublin
- Glasgow
- Isle of Grain
- Immingham
- Leeds
- Lille
- Liverpool
- Manchester
- Rotterdam
- Southampton
- South Shields
- Tilbury

== See also ==
- Containerization
- Intermodal container
- Intermodal freight transport
