= Hydrauliska Industri AB =

Swedish manufacturer of industrial mechanics

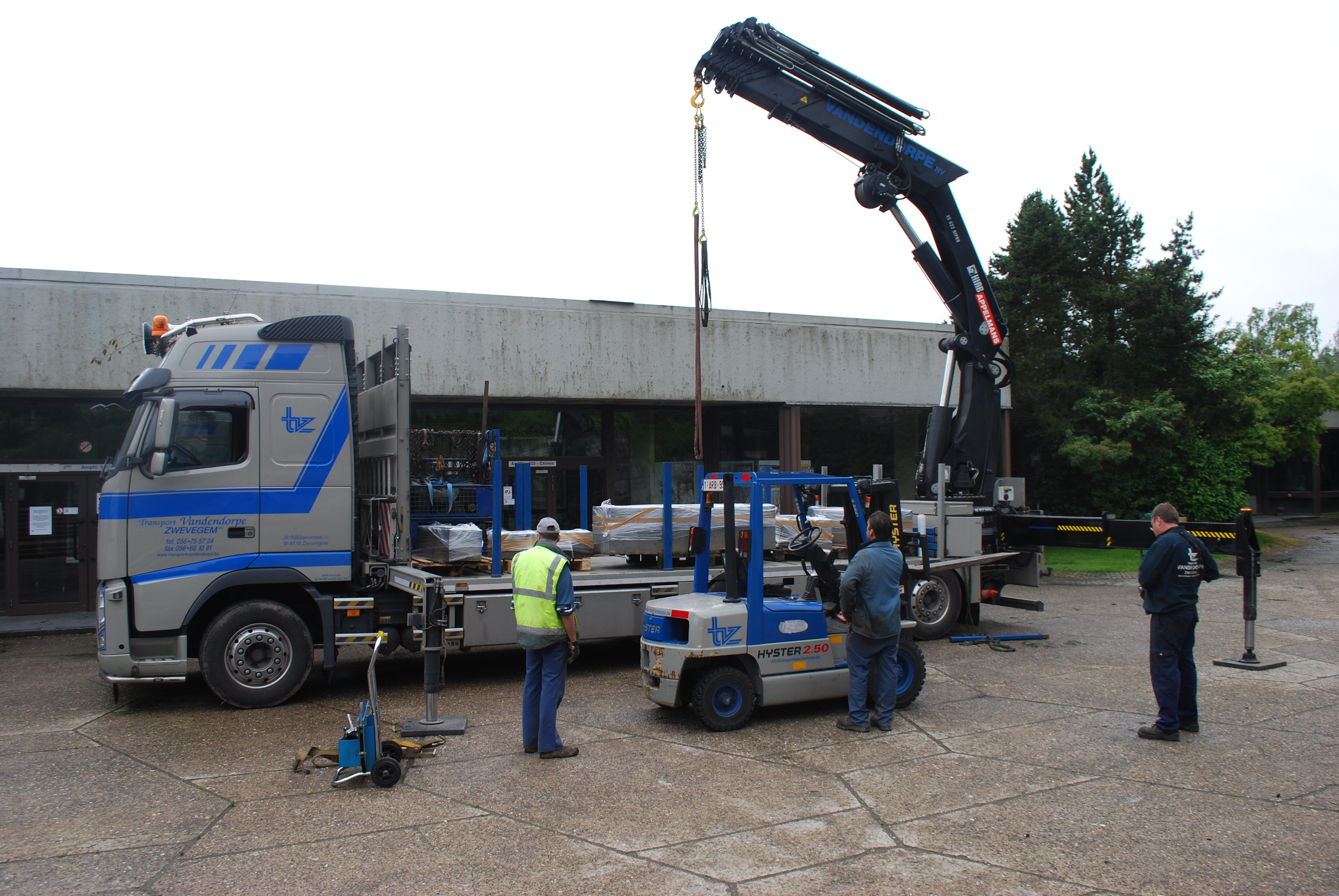
HIAB crane mounted at rear of truck bed, about to load a forklift

Hydrauliska Industri AB (Hiab) is a Swedish manufacturer of loader cranes, demountable container handlers, forestry cranes, knuckle boom cranes, truck-mounted forklifts and tail lifts. The company is owned by the Cargotec Corporation.

== History ==
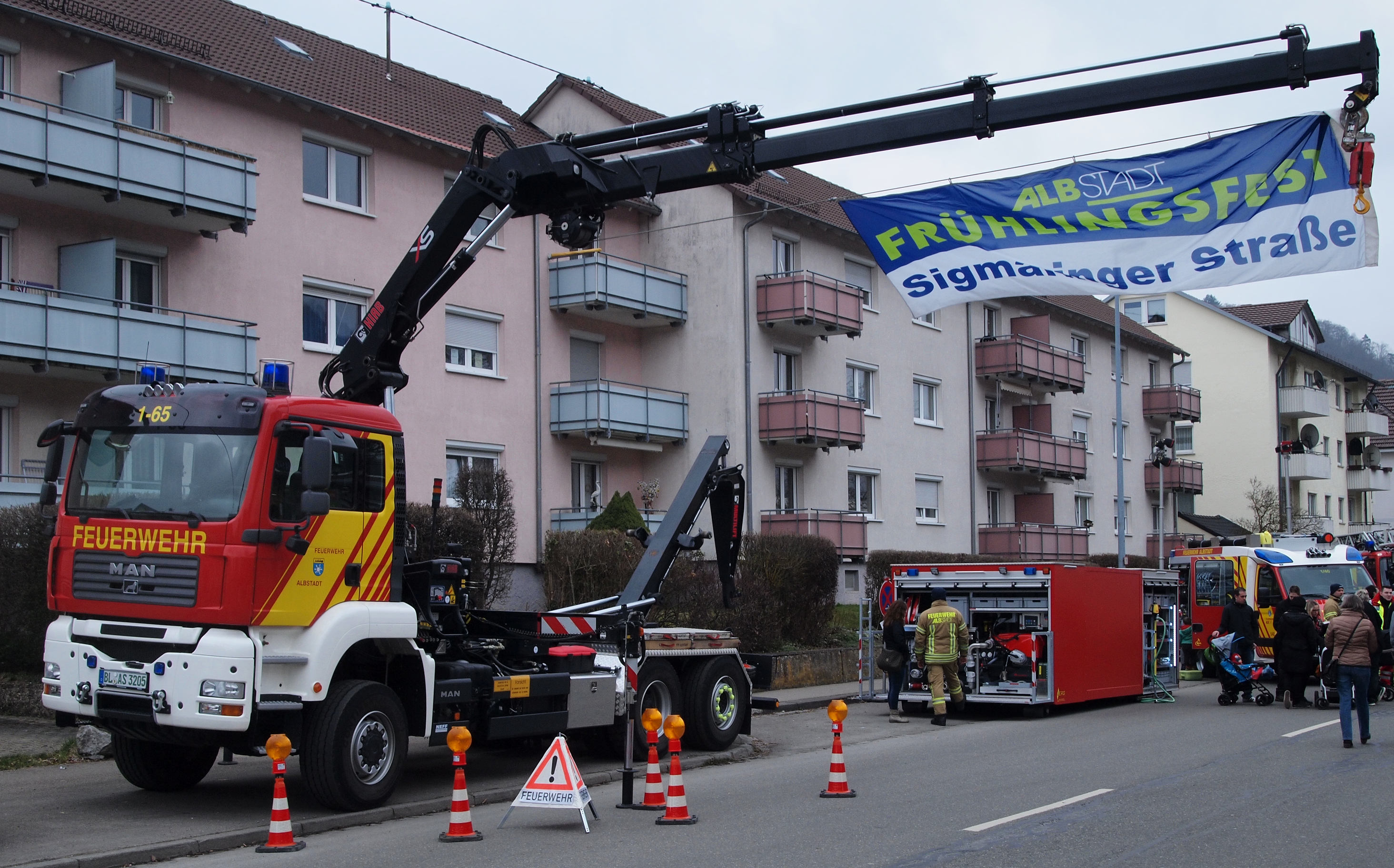
Fire engine equipped with HIAB crane and hook-lift

The name, Hiab, comes from the commonly used abbreviation of Hydrauliska Industri AB, a company founded in Hudiksvall, Sweden 1944 by Eric Sundin, a ski manufacturer who saw a way to utilize a truck's engine to power loader-cranes through the use of hydraulics. Hiab invented the world's first hydraulic truck-mounted crane in 1947. On the other side of the Bothnian Sea in Raisio, Finland about the same time, three brothers, Mikko, Mauno and Martti Terho developed a mechanical cable-operated interchangeable platform-loader (Cablelift) that utilised the truck's front winch, with which it was possible to use a variety of platform bodies. In 1949 they started Multilift to manufacture their innovative load handling equipment.

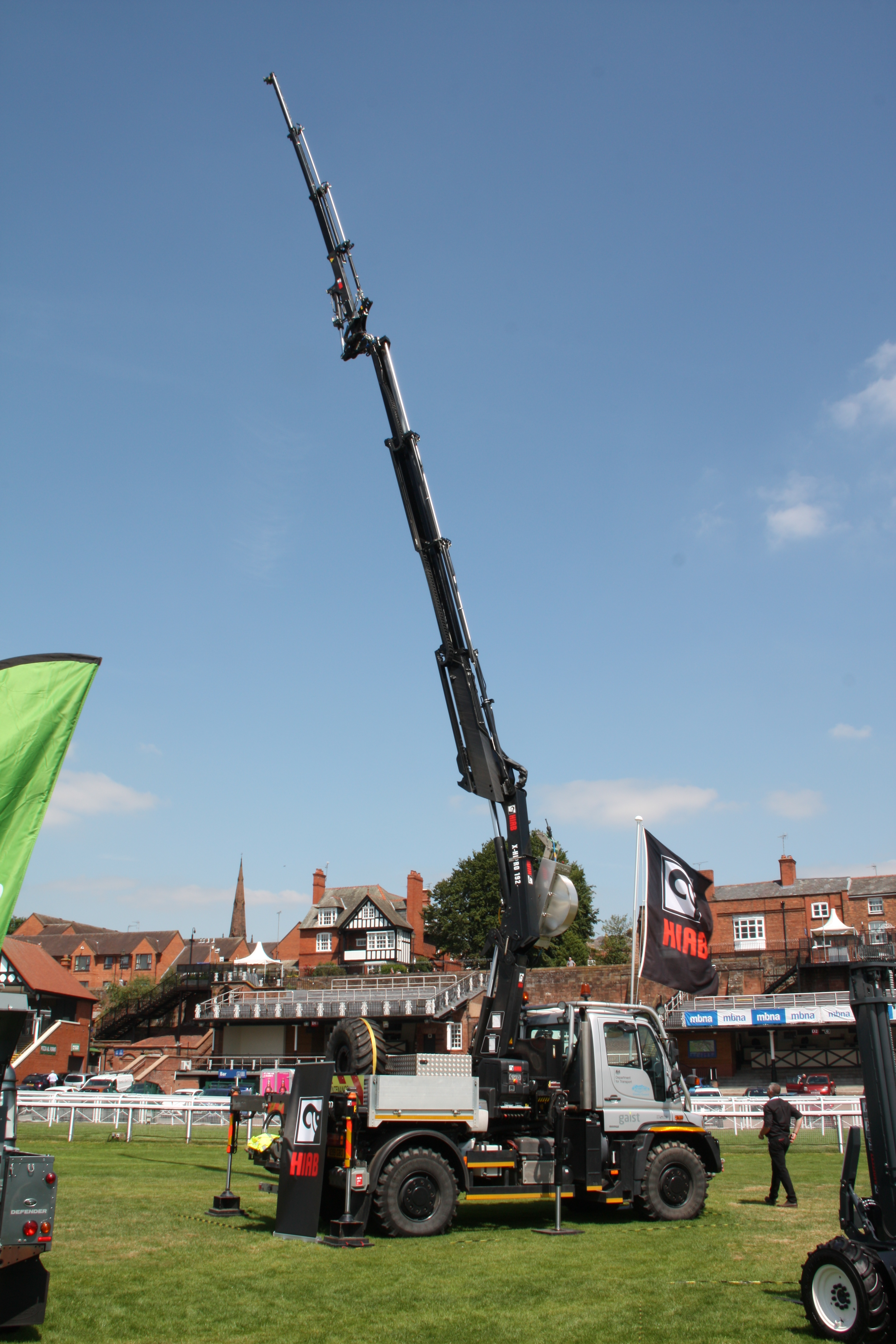
Unimog with HIAB loader crane.

The roots of today's Hiab Company lie in a series of acquisitions from 1977 onwards, when Partek Corporation embarked on a comprehensive diversification and internationalisation strategy. Founded in 1898, Partek Corporation was one of the oldest industrial companies in Finland, originally producing limestone and later a versatile range of materials for the construction industry. In 1977 Partek decided to expand into the engineering industry and thereby decrease its dependence on domestic construction when it first bought named Multilift. Eight years later, in 1985, the company bought Hiab with its forestry-crane subsidiary Jonsered. In 1988 they bought Loglift - as the name implies, also a forestry crane manufacturer.

During the late 1990s Partek strategically restructured itself into an engineering company, fully divesting its construction-materials activity and making several acquisitions in the load-handling equipment business.

The load-handling side of Partek expanded in 2000 with the acquisition of the Zeteco Group (including among others ZEPRO and WALTCO tail lifts). During the same year the truck-mounted forklift business was acquired, bringing today's MOFFETT and PRINCETON PIGGY BACK brands into the company.

KONE Corporation acquired Partek in 2002. In 2004 the load-handling functionality was renamed after its most valuable product brand, HIAB. On 1 June 2005 KONE Corporation demerged into new KONE and Cargotec Corporation (listed in Helsinki Stock Exchange). Cargotec consists of Hiab load-handling, Kalmar container-handling and MacGREGOR marine-cargo handling services.

== See also ==
- Cargotec
- Grapple truck
- Loader crane
