= Atlas GmbH =

German construction equipment manufacturer

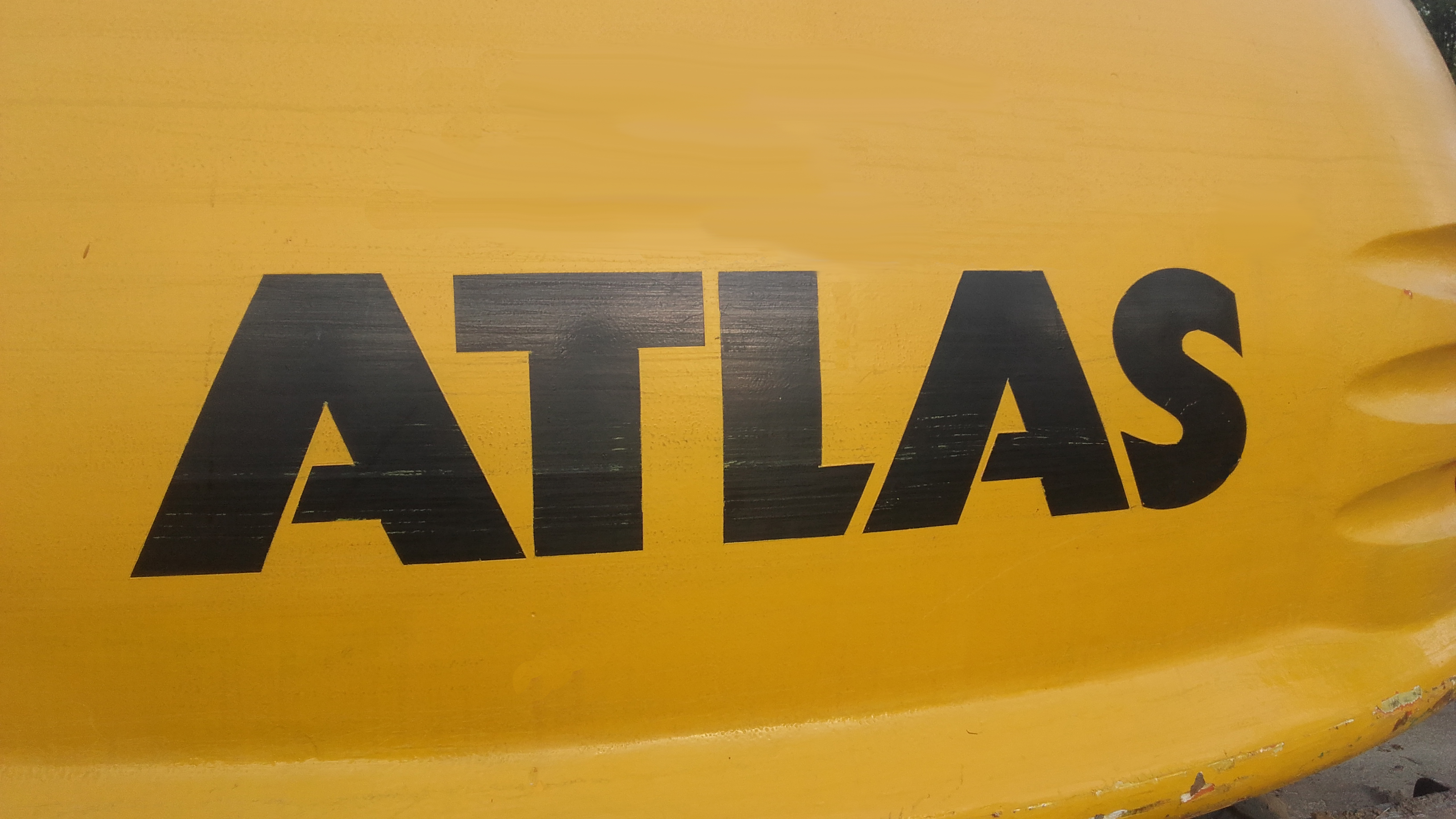
- Company type: GmbH
- Industry: Construction equipment
- Predecessor: Atlas Weyhausen, Atlas Terex (2001–10)
- Founded: 1919, 2010
- Founder: Hinrich Weyhausen
- Successor: Atlas GmbH
- Headquarters: Ganderkesee, Germany
- Area served: Worldwide
- Key people: Bob Litchev
- Products: Excavators, Cranes, Wheel loaders
- Net income: € 151.5 million
- Number of employees: 498 (2013)
- Website: www.atlasgmbh.com
- Footnotes / references In February 2026, the company entered preliminary self-administration insolvency proceedings.

The Atlas GmbH (formerly 2010–16 Atlas Maschinen GmbH) is a medium-sized construction machinery manufacturer based in Ganderkesee. The company mainly manufactures wheeled excavators, two-way excavators and crawler excavators in various weight and performance categories, as well as loading cranes and medium-sized wheel loaders.

Atlas Weyhausen GmbH and Atlas GmbH have different origins and the brand name "Atlas" was used by both companies until the end of 2015. Since the end of 2015 Atlas Weyhausen GmbH uses the brand name "Weycor" for their products.

== History ==
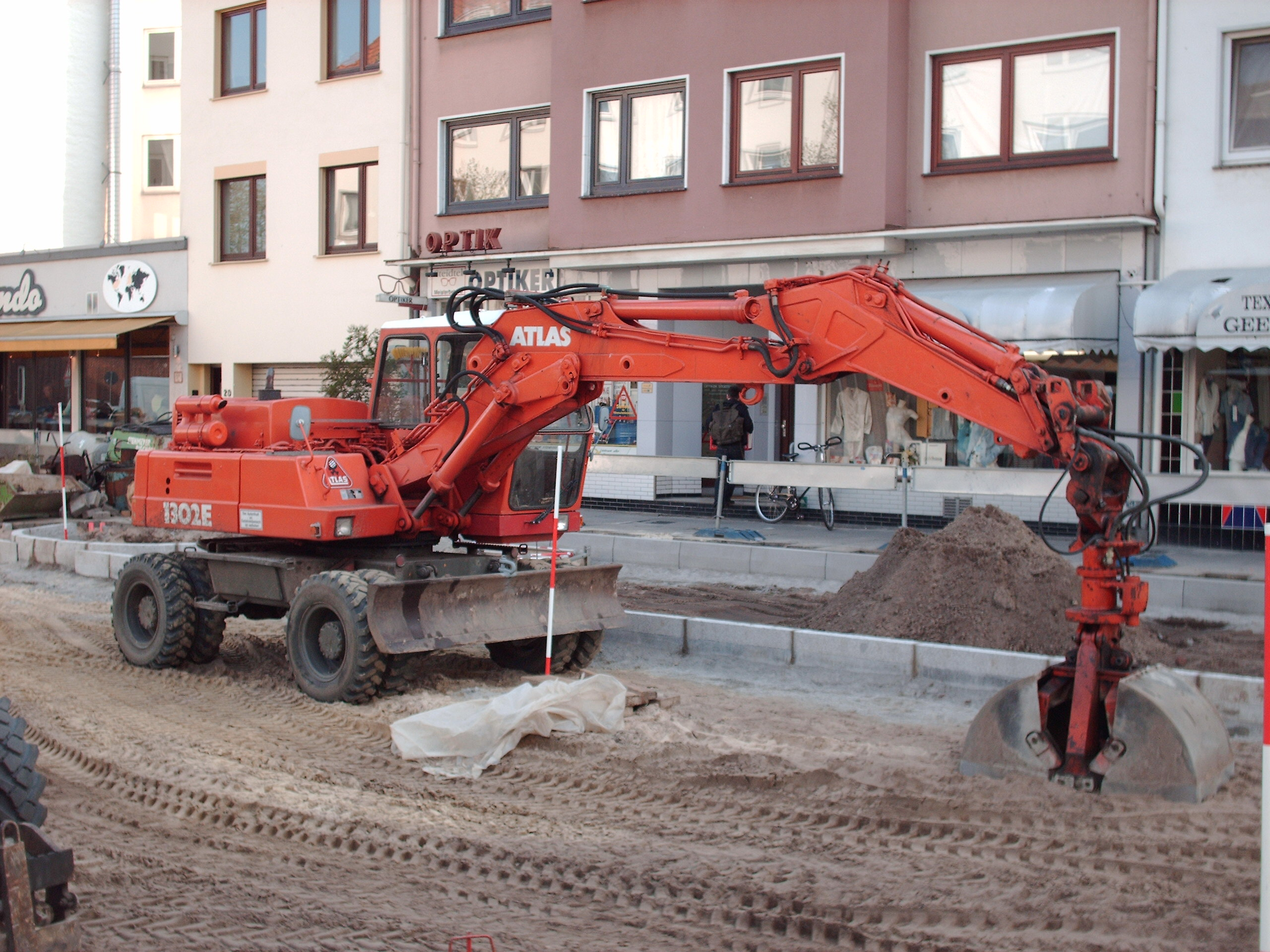
Atlas Excavator

The beginning of the Atlas GmbH goes back to the year 1919. At that time, Hinrich Weyhausen KG was founded with its headquarters in Delmenhorst. The company initially produced agricultural machinery and agricultural conveyors. The trademark "Atlas" was created in 1936, the first fully hydraulic excavator was manufactured in 1951.

Hinrich Weyhausen KG steadily pushed ahead with the development of hydraulic excavators in the following years, and in the 1960s assumed an internationally leading position in the construction of hydraulic excavators. In 1962 around 1000 employees worked for the company in the Vechta, Ganderkesee, Löningen an Blackwood (Scotland) plants. In 1969, founder Hinrich Weyhausen died and his son Günter Weyhausen took over the management of Hinrich Weyhausen KG. The brother of Günter Weyhausen, Friedrich Weyhausen, founded in 1971 an independent sister company to Hinrich Weyhausen KG. "F. Weyhausen GmbH & Co. KG" which established its headquarters in Wildeshausen and opened a factory in Westerstede for the production of wheel loaders and backhoe loaders.

In 1986, the renaming of Hinrich Weyhausen KG to Atlas Weyhausen GmbH occurred. The company ran into financial difficulties in 1999 and was sold to EDER Handel und Beteiligungen GmbH, which it resold in 2001 to the US construction equipment manufacturer Terex from Westport and renamed Atlas Terex GmbH. The name Atlas Weyhausen GmbH was thus no longer in use and was taken over in 2010 by the former sister company F. Weyhausen GmbH & Co. KG in the course of a change of legal form.

Following losses in this business unit, it was sold to investor Filip S. Filipov for one million euro in March 2010. The investor named the newly founded company Atlas Maschinen GmbH . In August 2010 Filipov also acquired the brand name Kaelble from Terex. In April 2016, Atlas Maschinen GmbH changed its name to Atlas GmbH.

In 2017, Atlas Kompakt GmbH was founded at the location in Delmenhorst. The company sells mini and midi excavators of the Chinese manufacturer Sunward in the Atlas colors.

Filipov died on 26 August 2022.

In February 2026, Atlas GmbH applied for restructuring in self-administration at the Delmenhorst District Court. The court ordered preliminary self-administration on 6 February 2026, and business operations continued during the proceedings.
