= Sidelifter =

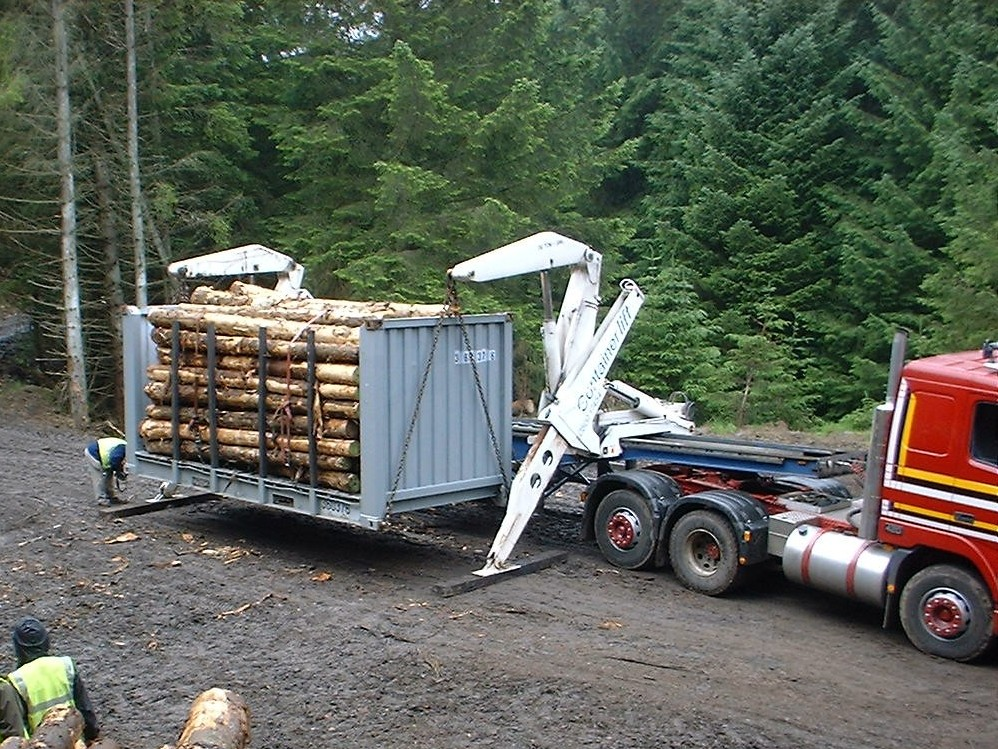
A sidelifter lifting a container on site

A sidelifter is a specialised vehicle or semi-trailer used to hoist and transport ISO standard intermodal containers over longer distances.

== Overview ==
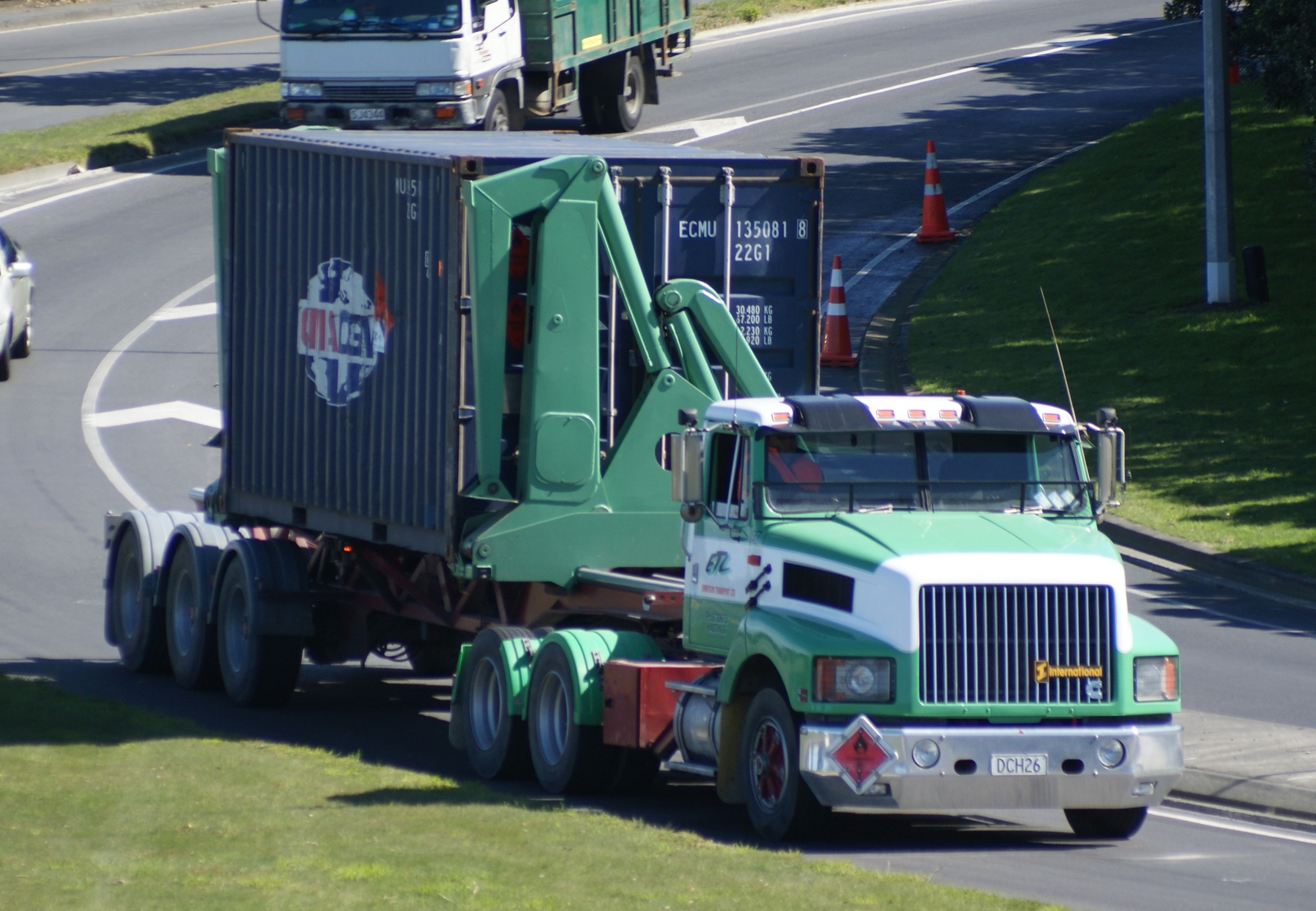
Travelling by road

The sidelifter loads and unloads containers via a pair of hydraulic powered cranes mounted at each end of the vehicle chassis. The cranes are designed to lift containers from the ground, from other vehicles including rolling stock, from railway wagons and directly from stacks on docks or aboard container ships. A standard sidelifter is also able to stack a container at a two containers' height on the ground. If the sidelifter chassis is of 40' length or more, the cranes of the sidelifter can be shifted hydraulically along the sidelifter chassis to be able to pick up either one 20', one 40', or two 20' ISO containers at a time.

As the Sidelifter is suitable for travelling on general roads for large distances and able to quickly load and unload without additional equipment, it is often used for delivering and picking up shipping containers from within a commercial district. Although these can self load, they are more often loaded, or unloaded at the port with a straddle carrier or reach stacker.

== Alternative names ==
This equipment has been referred to with a myriad of alternate names. Some of these are:

- Self loading truck or self loading trailer, (SLT)
- Sideloader or sidlastare
- Containerlift or containerlifter
- Simalift or Hammarlift
- Boxmover or boxloader
- Selflifter
- Container picker or sidepicker
- Swinglift or swing lifter
- Valartlift

== History ==
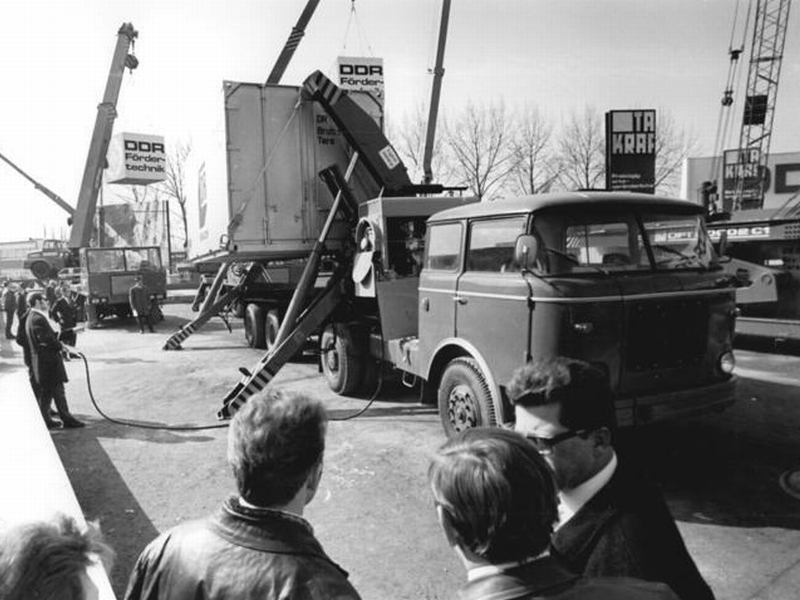
Klaus designed Seitenlader in 1968

The sidelifter was invented during the 1960s by Kaspar Klaus who was granted a number of patents for the equipment manufactured by Klaus Transport-systeme GmbH of Germany, with a focus on military operations. The Klaus Sidelifters were heavy and not cost effective for commercial use. Steelbro in New Zealand bought the Klaus Transport business and further developed the sidelifter, resulting in reduced tare weight and allowing freight companies to legally carry higher payload. It was also developed by Hammar Maskin AB in Sweden. It has since become a commonly used vehicle in intermodal facilities worldwide. The principal alternative to the costly machinery of the sidelifter is the use of swap body containers, which are too light to be stacked but can be unloaded from a truck by means of foldable legs.

== Design ==
Sidelifters generally have the following attributes:

- Lifting cranes (sometimes called crane modules). The hydraulically powered cranes lift the container (from the ground, loading dock, another vehicle, railway wagon or from the top of another container placed on the ground or other location) on and off the chassis. These cranes are placed on top of the sidelifter chassis and they are normally able to travel along the chassis being shifted by hydraulic cylinders or hydraulic motors in order to load varying container lengths.
- A power source. While typically the cranes are powered by a trailer mounted diesel engine or gasoline engine, the cranes are sometimes powered via a PTO from the truck or tractor.
- Stabilizing legs. These are fitted with hydraulic legs which are necessary to permit the lifting fully laden shipping containers without tilting the vehicle. These may be adjustable to assist operation on unlevel ground and facilitate greater safety margins and load limits when stacking containers. When lifting containers in confined locations or from rail wagons or trailer decks, tilting and extending legs provide additional capability.
- Chains, which are attached from the top of the cranes to the corner castings at the base of the container(s) during lifting operations. There is a special linking device that when placed between two 20 ft containers allows the user to lock two 20 ft (2 TEUs) containers together allowing the sidelifter to lift them as if they were a 40 ft container.
- The tractor/cab, which pulls the trailer, and in some cases supplies power through the PTO.This tractor/cab always supplies the compressed air for the wheels' brakes of the sidelifter. Normally, the sidelifter can not be operated without being connected to the Tractor because even if the power pack is under the sidelifter, the tractor provides compressed air for the trailer brakes and also additional stability for the lifting operation.
- The chassis, which bears the weight of the container when loaded, as well as supports the cranes.
- The remote control, a device with joysticks & buttons typically attached via a multi-pair electric wire or via a radio signal and that allows the operator to walk around the container and view the unit from various angles during operation.

Sidelifter machines were designed to lift a maximum of 45 tonnes (50 short tons; 44 long tons). More recent designs lift 47 tonnes (52 short tons; 46 long tons) though smaller machines are also available where a lighter tare weight is important.

In addition to controlling the raising and lowering of the cranes, the operator can sometimes tilt the chassis using the stabilising legs which provides a limited ability to operate on non-level ground.

Some sidelifters have a telescopic chassis, sometimes called trombone chassis, allowing the unit to expand and contract in order to accommodate 20 ft, 40 ft or even 45 ft containers. These Trombone units are specially suited for small secondary roads where cornering is quite difficult with 40 ft trailers.

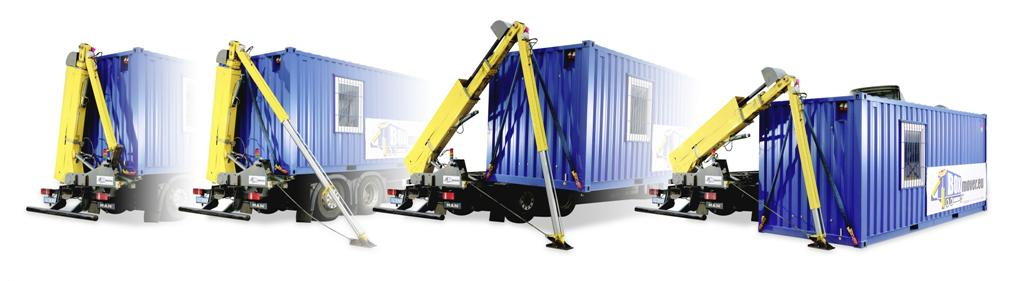
Operation of a side-lifter.

== Safety ==
A sidelifter is rated for ISO containers with a specified maximum total weight and to a maximum distance from the sidelifter chassis (also called maximum reach or maximum radius). This information is located on a nameplate provided by the manufacturer, and loads must not exceed these specifications. Sidelifter units have been known to overturn like any other crane, especially when lifting weights that are heavier than the maximum allowed weight or when operating at a radius that is bigger than the maximum allowed radius. Sidelifter units must always be operated only by trained personnel. Safety devices such as Electronic Stability System that prevent the sidelifter from rolling over may be sometimes required by local legislation. Safetywear for the operator and any assistants can include top and bottom reflector gear including a green or orange reflector vest and hard hat. In some jurisdictions safety goggles are required to protect against debris that can fall from containers.

== Alternatives ==
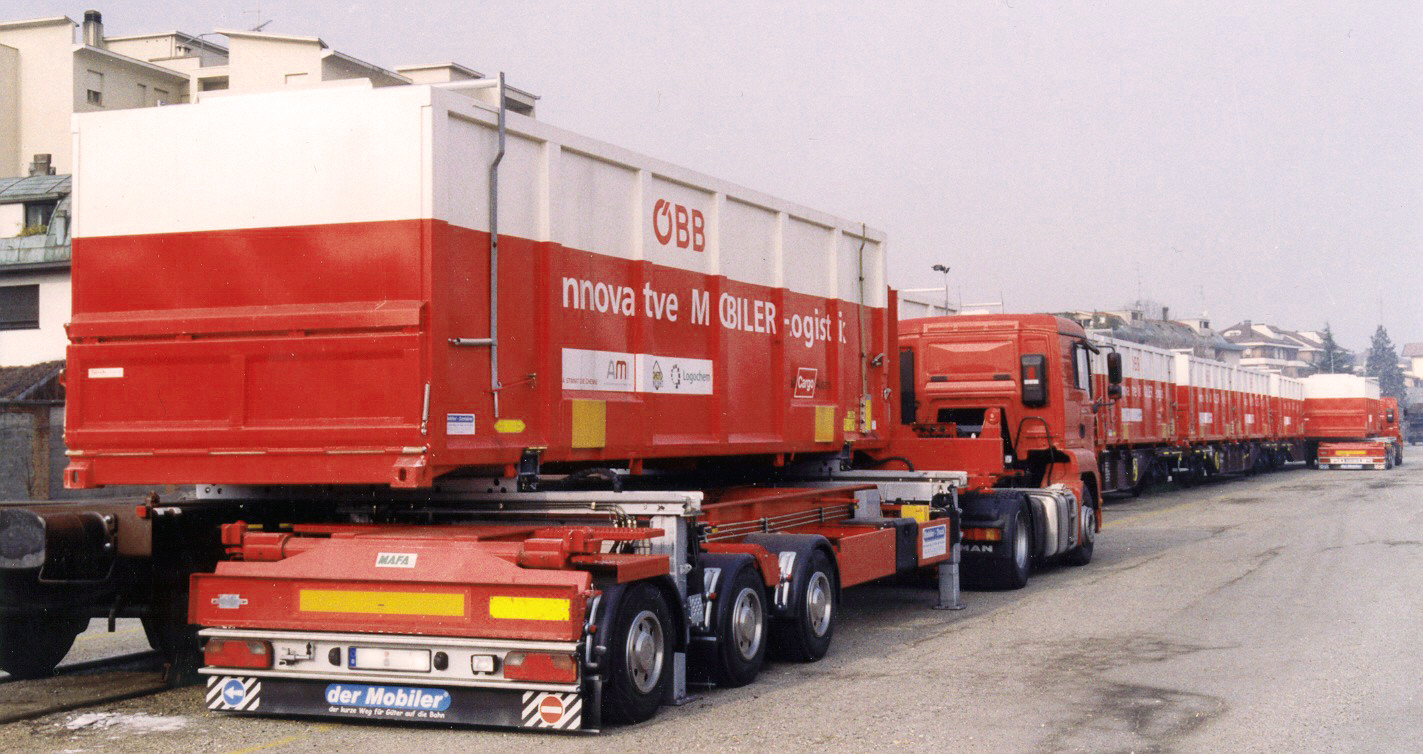
Austrian Federal Railways uses trucks called Mobiler, that can slide a large container straight on or off a railcar.

A rubber tyred gantry crane is another device for loading containers on to trucks (as well as around the port) although these are not road-going so must be in place at every destination that containers are to be delivered or collected at. As well a general purpose tilt deck truck (also called a tilt tray, rollback or a slide) equipped with a winch can load/unload a 20-foot container from the rear of the vehicle.

== See also ==
- CargoBeamer
- Reach stacker
- Swap body
- Tank chassis
