= Lorry-Rail S.A. =

Lorry-Rail is a rolling highway operator. Its mission consists of developing, promoting and marketing the new 1050 km rail-road service from Bettembourg, Luxembourg to le Boulou near Perpignan, France, for standard unaccompanied semi-trailers. It uses Modalohr piggyback wagons.

== History ==
It opened in March 2007.

Traction is provided by the SNCF. Marketing the service is performed by a new company, Lorry-Rail, whose main shareholders are the Caisse des dépôts et consignations (42.6%) and Vinci Concessions (19.9%), the national rail companies SNCF and Chemins de Fer Luxembourgeois (CFL), and Lohr Industrie, who provided the wagons.

The wagons are special lowered wagons made by Modalohr successfully used since 2003 on the France-Italy Alpine rolling highway. Lorry-Rail, in its initial forecasts, plans to invest about 25 million euros for the purchase of cars and the development of the terminal platform of le Boulou. The Grand Duchy of Luxembourg subsidized facilities of the platform Bettembourg near Luxembourg.

A grant of € 30 million was allocated by the French Agency for funding of transport infrastructure funding (AFITF) for development works to increase the loading gauge on the line.

It was intended as a first step to run one pair of trains (one in each direction) every night between 6 pm and 6 am. Each train consists of 18 wagons with a capacity of 36 trailers. The cost of transport is estimated at 670 euros per trailer (without driver) and 630 euros per swap. Traffic is estimated at 30,000 trucks per year, or 4% of long-distance traffic in France.

The trip from Luxembourg to Perpignan takes 14 and a half hours compared to 17 to 22h by road. In May 2009 a second daily round trip was set up, and a third in April 2010, while traffic reached 3,000 trucks. A fourth daily rotation was developed in December 2010. From May 2011 three round trips per week will be extended to the south of Sweden.

A second rolling highway was planned for 2011 on the Atlantic coast between Lille and Irun.

Trailers per wagon	2
Max speed	100 km/h (62 mph)
Wagons per rake	18
Wagon unladen weight	34 t (33 long tons; 37 short tons)
Wagon loaded weight	110 t (108 long tons; 121 short tons)
Total weight of rake	1,800 t (1,772 long tons; 1,984 short tons)
Wagon length articulated car	34 m (111 ft 6 5/8 in)
Rake length	720 m (2,362 ft 2 1/2 in)

== See also ==
- Piggyback
- Trailer-on-flat-car
