= SNCF Class BB 36000 =

French electric locomotive

SNCF BB 36000 Astride
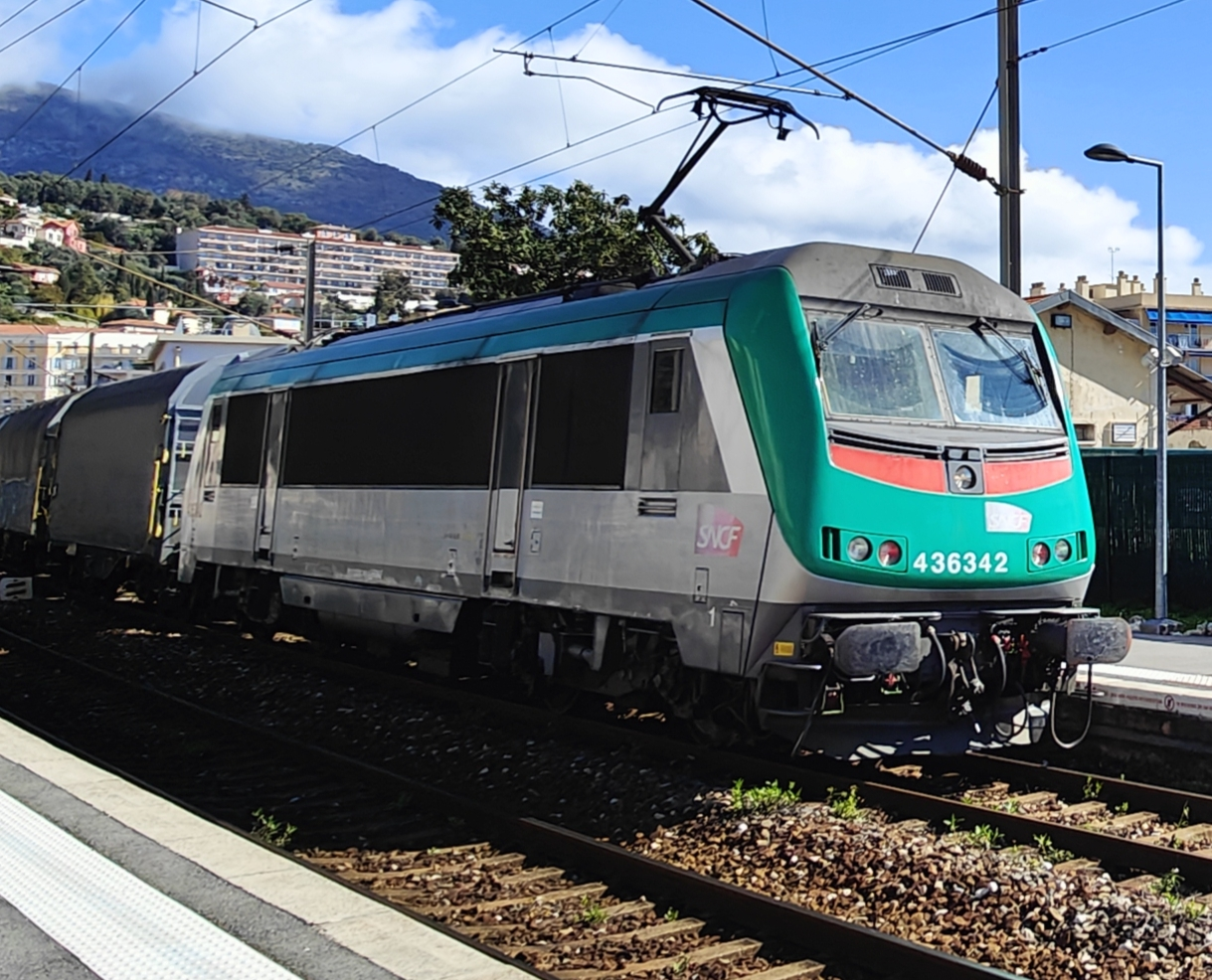
- SNCF BB 36000
Type and origin
- Power type: Electric
- Builder: Alstom
- Build date: 1996–2001
- Total produced: 60‡
Specifications
- Configuration
  - UIC: Bo′Bo′
- Gauge: 1,435 mm (4 ft 8 1/2 in), clearance UIC 505-1
- Bogies: bogie centre distance: 19.110 m (62 ft 8 in)‡ bogie wheelbase: 3.000 m (9 ft 10 in)‡
- Wheel diameter: 1,150 mm (45.28 in)‡
- Length: 19.110 m (62 ft 8 in)
- Width: 2.59 m (8 ft 6 in)†
- Height: 4.3 m (14 ft 1 in)†
- Loco weight: 90 tonnes (89 long tons; 99 short tons)
- Electric system/s: Catenary; 25 kV 50 Hz AC, 1.5 kV DC; 3 kV DC
- Current pickup: Pantograph
- Traction motors: 4 asynchronous motors
- MU working: BB 36300 subtype only
- Loco brake: Electrodynamic - regenerative and rheostatic (2,950 kW or 3,960 hp)
- Safety systems: KVB, RPS, GSMR radio Memor (Belgium); RSC, SCMT (Italy)
Performance figures
- Maximum speed: 200 km/h (120 mph)
- Power output: 5,600 kW (7,500 hp) Continuous; 6,000 kW (8,000 hp) Max.*
- Tractive effort: starting : 320 kN (72,000 lb_{f}) continuous: 285 kN (64,000 lb_{f}) @ 70 km/h (43 mph)
Career
- Numbers: 36001–36030; 36331–36060
- Locale: BB 36000 France and Belgium; BB 36300 France and Italy
- Disposition: In service

The SNCF Class BB 36000 locomotives (named Astride) are a class of triple voltage 4 axle twin bogie electric locomotives built by GEC-Alsthom (later Alstom) between 1996 and 2001 for SNCF.

Sixty units were built, with thirty units later converted to subclasses 36200, and 36300 - locomotives with additional safety equipment for cross border trains between France and Italy. As of 2012 there are 30 units of the original 36000 class and 30 units of the 36300 subtype. Locomotives operating in Italy have been given the Italian designation FS Class E436.

The subgroup 36001-36030 operates mostly on French-Belgian freight corridors.

== History ==
=== Background and design ===
The first 30 locomotives of Class BB 36000 were built as a result of a modification of an order for 264 of the dual voltage SNCF Class BB 26000 (Sybic); instead only 234 Sybics were built, the last 30 of the order were instead built as a triple voltage design capable of also operating under 3 kV DC with a different electric motor type (AC induction) and newer power semiconductor device technology (GTO type); the multi-voltage specifications came from an expected increase in cross-border traffic, as encouraged by the European Union's specification of "freight corridors". The locomotives were designed to achieve the same traction performance when operated under 25 kV AC, and 3 and 1.5 kV DC; Other design features required or introduced were conformity with European electromagnetic interference standard EN 50121, increased energy efficiency (using regenerative braking), water cooled power electronics, (Note: Use of freon based coolants as used on the SNCF BB 26000 had been limited by the Montreal Convention.) and (partial) redundancy of components on failure, and improved maintainability.

The locomotives were given the name Astride, derived from Asynchrone Tri-system Drive Engine, (Note: The acroynimics "Asytric'" (Asynchronous tricourant) and "Asytrit" (Asynchronous tritension) have also been used.) the external design was by MDB design.

When powered by a 25 kV AC overhead supply, the primary winding of a 5.76 MW (7,720 hp) electrical transformer is connected to the 25 kV 50 Hz supply; with equivalent outputs on four secondary windings. Each secondary winding supplies 1450 V AC which is rectified, (Note: Switched power electronics performing Pulse-width modulation at ~300Hz was used in the rectification stage allowing voltage control; these power electronic devices are reconfigured as choppers when operating under DC supply, and used to raise the voltage as part of a DC-DC converter when under 1500 V DC supply.) and the outputs connected in parallel to a smoothed 2.8 kV intermediate DC link supplying four parallel-connected inverters, each of which individually drives a traction motor.

When operating under a DC supply, the electrical circuit is configured with two separate intermediate 2.8 kV DC links, one per bogie; each DC bus powers two parallel-connected inverters, one for each traction motor. When powered from 1.5 kV DC, choppers are used to step up the voltage to 2.8 kV, under 3 kV supply the circuit is re-used with the connection of the DC-DC converter's inductors reconfigured.

The four electric traction motors are force-ventilated, 2070 V (phase difference) 600 A three-phase induction motors weighing 2.550 t (2.510 long tons; 2.811 short tons); the motors have integrated reduction gear and are bogie-mounted. Each of the traction motors has a separate inverter. Dynamic rheostatic electrical braking effort is dissipated through electronically switched resistances connected to the DC link. A maximum braking force of 130 kN (29,000 lb_{f}) is achieved from 30 to 80 kilometres per hour (19 to 50 mph), above 80 km/h (50 mph) electric braking is limited to 2.96 MW (3,970 hp). When operating under 25 kV AC, the electrical circuit allows regenerative braking.

Auxiliary electrical supply is taken via a step-down chopper to a 525 V DC supply; there are four 75 kW (101 hp) (380 V max) three-phase inverters. Two of them supply variable speed and voltage power for cooling fans for the traction motors, transformer, rheostatic brake, locomotive main electronics block. Another one supplies fixed voltage and frequency (air compressor, oil pumps, other loads), the inverters are switchable with one unit providing redundancy. Additionally there are two 72 V 40 A inverters for battery charging.

=== Subclasses and operations ===
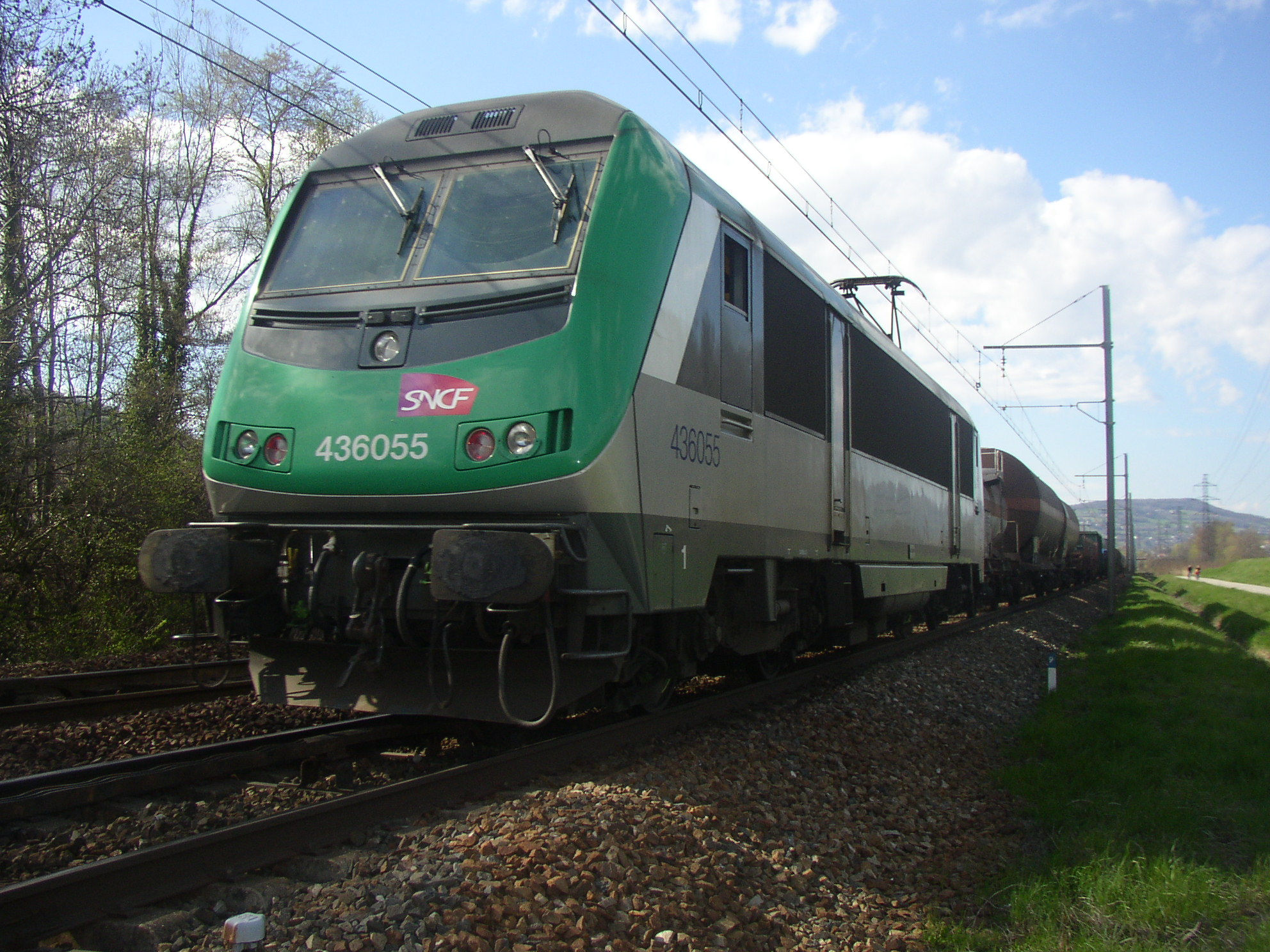
SNCF 36055

An additional thirty units were ordered by SNCF in addition to the modified Sybic order. Sixty locomotives were delivered between 1997 and 2002; numbered BB36001 to BB36060. BB36001 to BB36030 received a red livery, and were primarily used for trains to Belgium. The remainder received a green freight livery, and were mainly used for trains to Italy. At the same time the closely similar SNCB Class 13 and CFL Class 3000 for Belgium and Luxembourg were manufactured.

The class were designed as mixed-use locomotive, and were to be used Nightstar cross-channel passenger sleeper services (cancelled 1997/9).

In July 2010 the locomotives numbered 36001 to 36030 were transferred to SNCF's rolling stock leasing subsidiary Akiem.

==== France-Italy ====
From 2003 locomotives were modified for work into Italy; two subclasses were created BB36200 and BB36300. 12 units of the BB36200 class were created, modified to allow multiple unit operation, and with fire extinguishers fitted. 8 units of the BB36300 subclass were created with the same modifications as the BB36200 plus the addition of the SAFI (Signal d'Alarme à Freinage Inhibable) safety system. Later, all BB36200s were converted to BB36300s, along with remaining units 36051 to 36060.

Since 2003, rolling road trains (operated by Trenitalia / SNCF Geodis subsidiary AFA Autostrada Ferroviaria Alpina) have been hauled by Astride units between Aiton, Savoie, France and Orbassano, Italy using Modalohr wagons. The class had reliability problems, with an availability of 80%, and an incident rate of 23 per million km in 2005. As part of the joint venture Trenitalia acquired numbers 36339 and 36348 for AFA.

Locomotives operating in Italy for SNCF Fret's Italian subsidiary 'Monferail' were given the Italian numbering E 436.

=== For sale ===
In 2026 11 BB36300 locomotives were put up for sale by Agorastore for €135,000 each and they are currently being stored in Miramas.

== See also ==
- SNCB Class 13 of the Belgian Railways and CFL Class 3000 of the Luxembourg Railway are closely related to the BB 36000 class, sharing common bogies, frames, and mechanical equipment.
- HHP-8 locomotives use electrical equipment directly derived from the Astride class.
- Modalohr
