= 3000 class =

3000 class or Class 3000 may refer to:

- Class 3000 (standard), cleanroom standard
- 3000 class railcar, in Adelaide, South Australia
- Bangladesh Railway Class 3000, diesel-electric locomotives
- CFL Class 3000, electric locomotives
- GWR 3000 Class, 2-8-0 steam locomotives
- MRTC 3000 class, Manila light rail vehicles
- NIR Class 3000, diesel multiple units
