= CargoBeamer =

Intermodal transport system

CargoBeamer AG
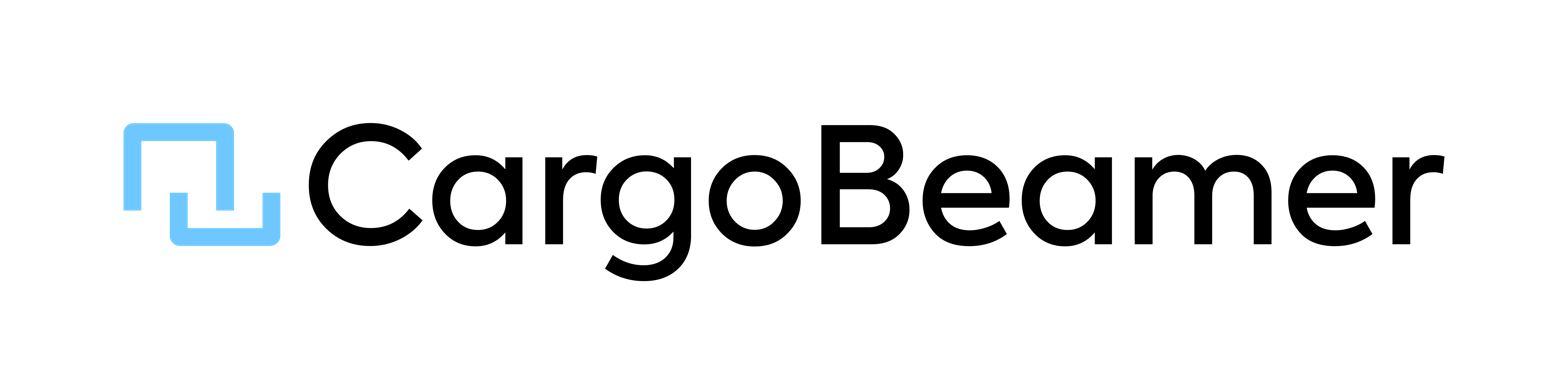
- Type: Privately held company
- Industry: Logistics, Intermodal Transportation
- Headquarters: Leipzig, Germany
- Key people: Markus E. Fischer (Chairman of the Board of Management); Tilman Apitzsch; Julian Hagenschulte
- Website: https://www.cargobeamer.com/

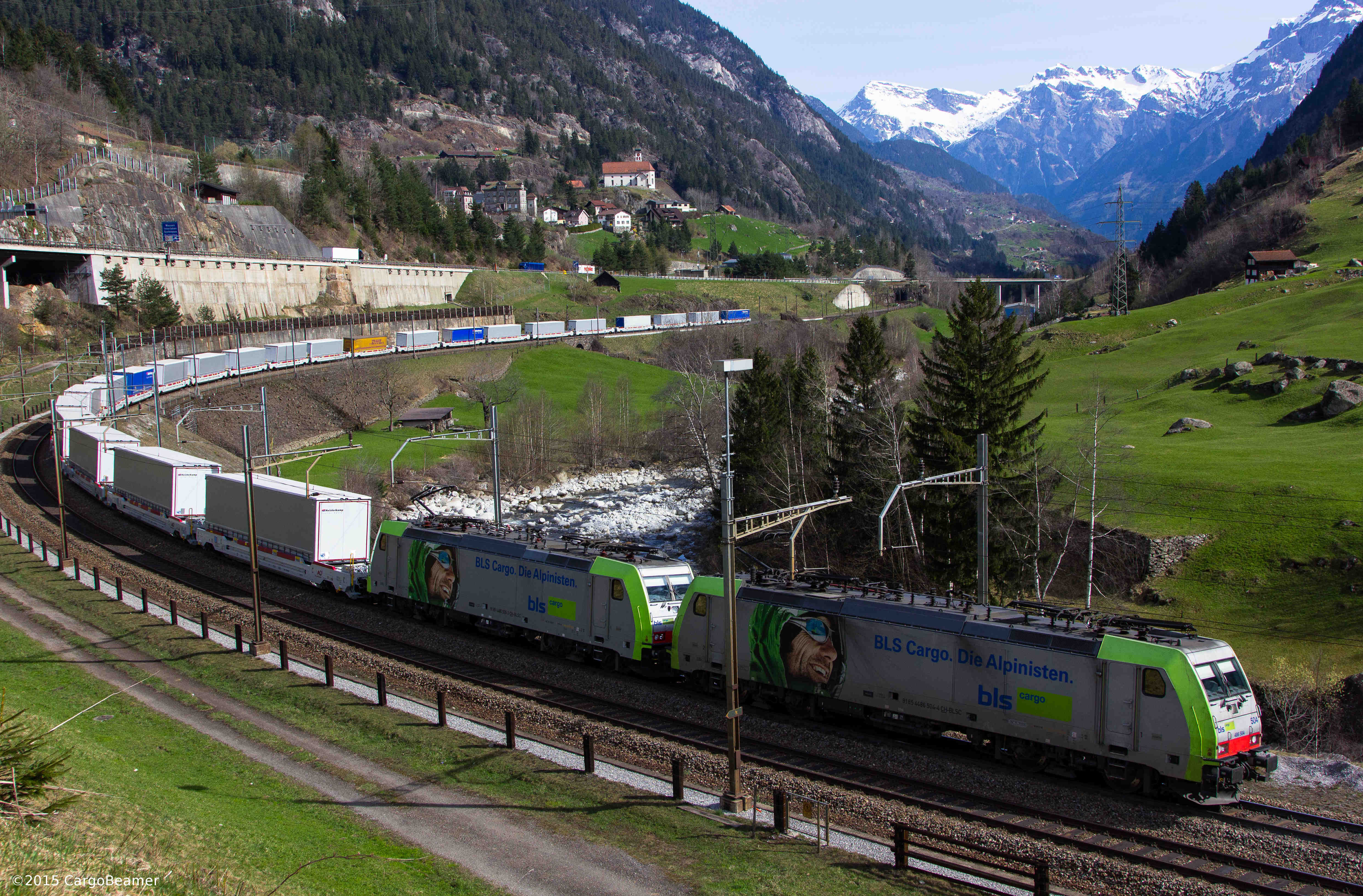
First CargoBeamer train on the Gotthard railway line, April 2015, pulled by BLS Cargo

Cargobeamer is an intermodal transport system. It involves specially designed pallets which can be carried on a road trailer; the pallets are fitted on top of flatcars but can slide sideways to allow trucks to drive on and off smoothly at intermodal terminals. A first testing terminal was opened in Leipzig in Germany; trial runs between Leipzig and Lithuania were planned in November 2010. Since July 2021, the first full CargoBeamer terminal is available to the public transport market in Calais, France.

== Network ==
The company advertises several routes:

- Kaldenkirchen – Domodossola (825 km [513 mi], 23 hours)
- Calais – Perpignan (1,200 km [750 mi], 28 hours)
- Stuttgart – Milan(500 km [310 mi], 20 hours)
- Venlo – Oradea (1,500 km [930 mi], 60 hours)
- Liège – Parma(715 km [444 mi], 40 hours)

=== Kaldenkirchen–Domodossola ===
CargoBeamer has operated a rail service between the Cabooter Rail Terminal in Kaldenkirchen (on the German–Dutch border) and the Schenker Italiana Terminal in Domodossola for several years, currently offering 20 weekly roundtrips. The trains run via the Lötschberg–Simplon route through the Swiss Alps. Between 2015 and 2020, more than 64,000 semi-trailers were transported on this route. With over 636 million tonne-kilometers of realized freight capacity, the company saved nearly 18,000 tons of CO₂ emissions compared to road transport. Utilization rates exceeded 87% on average, even when semi-trailers were still loaded conventionally with reach stackers instead of CargoBeamer terminals.

=== Calais–Perpignan ===
Since July 2021, CargoBeamer has operated its first line from the company’s own CargoBeamer terminal in Calais to Perpignan in southern France. The route offers four weekly roundtrips and is hauled by DB Cargo France (formerly Euro Cargo Rail).

=== Stuttgart–Milan ===
Since April 2026, CargoBeamer is operating four weekly roundtrips between Kornwestheim (near Stuttgart) and Sacconago near Milan. Traction is provided by SBB Cargo International. On the German side, the DUSS terminal Kornwestheim is used, while in Italy the trains are handled at the Malpensa Intermodale terminal in Sacconago. The route directly succeeded an earlier service of CargoBeamer between Stuttgart and Domodossola, which ran since February 2025.

=== Venlo–Oradea ===
CargoBeamer launched a connection between Venlo (Netherlands) and Oradea (Romania) in October 2025. On six weekly roundtrips, semi-trailers are transported over the 1,500 km journey.

=== Liège-Parma ===
In 2026, CargoBeamer introduced a new service between Liège and Parma. After CargoBeamer initially announced with 3 roundtrips and ran the line between Liège and Domodossola, the route will offer six weekly roundtrips since February 2026 and is running to Parma since April 2026.

== Realized and planned CargoBeamer-Terminals ==
=== Calais (France) ===
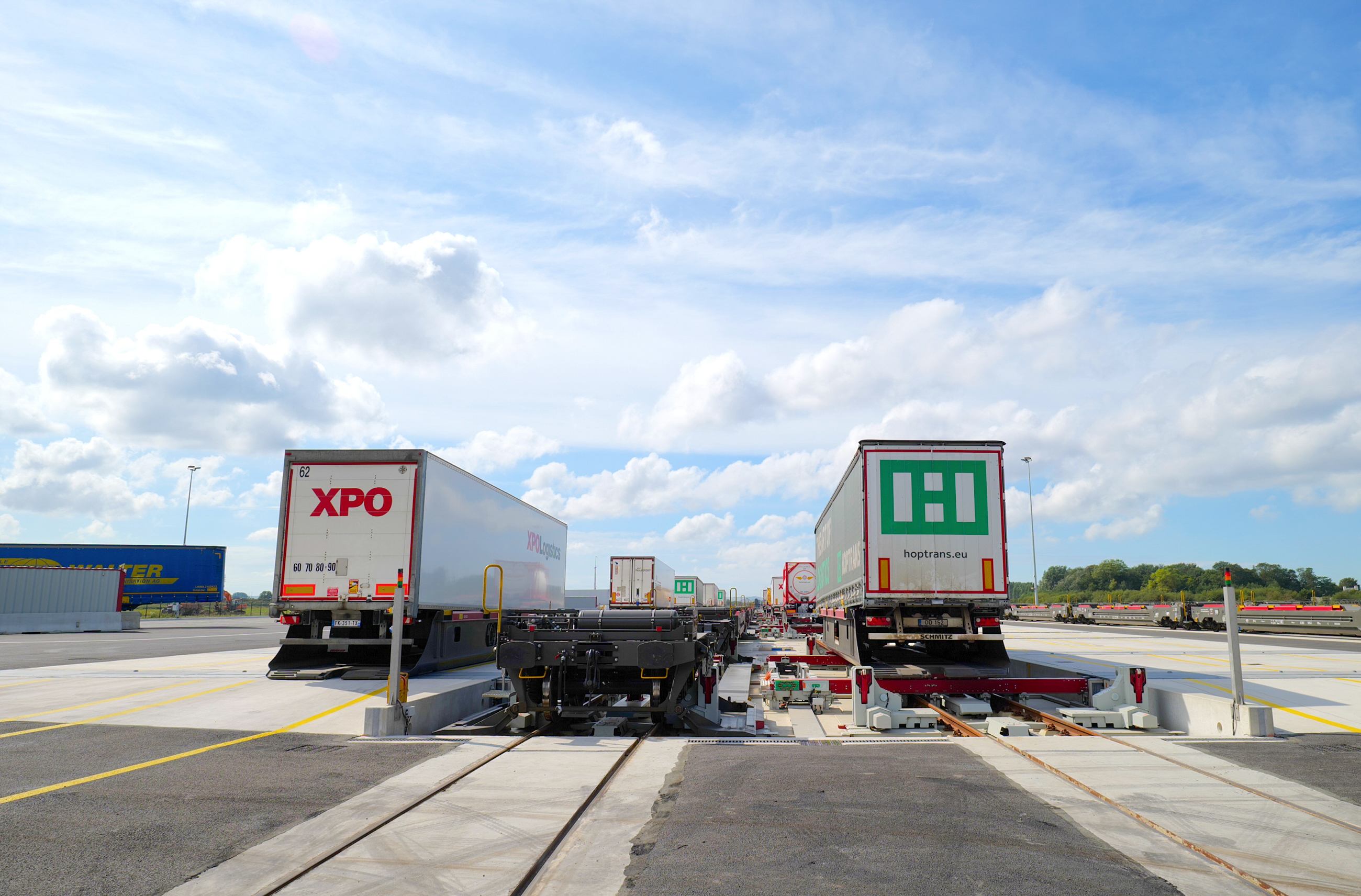
The CargoBeamer terminal in Calais in operation. One can see the horizontal movement of the semi-trailers, which were loaded onto the special CargoBeamer pallets.

In summer 2020, groundbreaking took place for the first fully developed CargoBeamer terminal in Calais. Located near the ferry port and the Channel Tunnel, the facility consists of two tracks and 18 “double-gate modules.” Once fully expanded, it will be able to unload and reload trains with 36 semi-trailers each within 20 minutes in a fully automated process. The terminal was inaugurated in July 2021 with a capacity of six train pairs per day. Since mid-July 2021, four weekly roundtrips to Perpignan have been offered.

=== Domodossola (Italy) ===
In March 2021, CargoBeamer announced the purchase of a terminal site in Domodossola, where the company intends to establish its second full-scale CargoBeamer terminal. From Domodossola, the company already operates 20 weekly roundtrips to Kaldenkirchen.

=== Kaldenkirchen (Germany) ===
In June 2025, CargoBeamer announced plans to build its first German terminal in Kaldenkirchen, North Rhine-Westphalia. The site near the German–Dutch border will feature one of Europe’s most modern and efficient transshipment facilities, designed specifically for shifting semi-trailers onto rail. Construction is scheduled to begin in the second half of 2025, with commissioning planned for 2026.

== Competing systems ==
Competing systems are offered by Modalohr and Cargospeed.

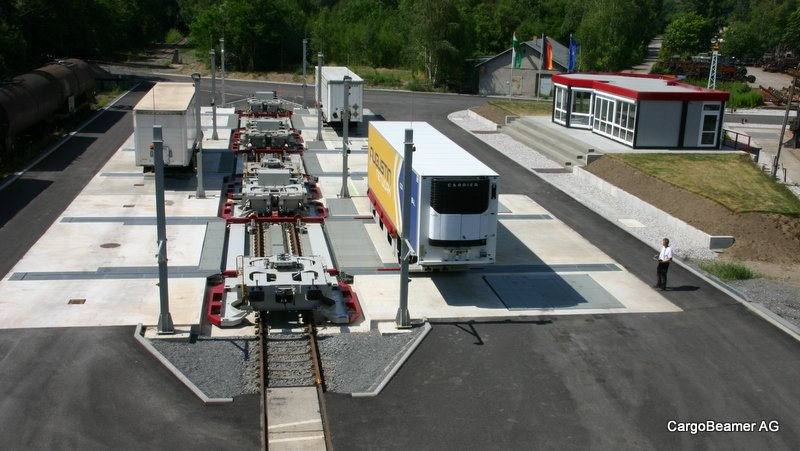
CargoBeamer test terminal Leipzig, Germany

== See also ==
- Loading gauge
- Rolling highway
- Sidelifter
- Swap body
- Tank chassis
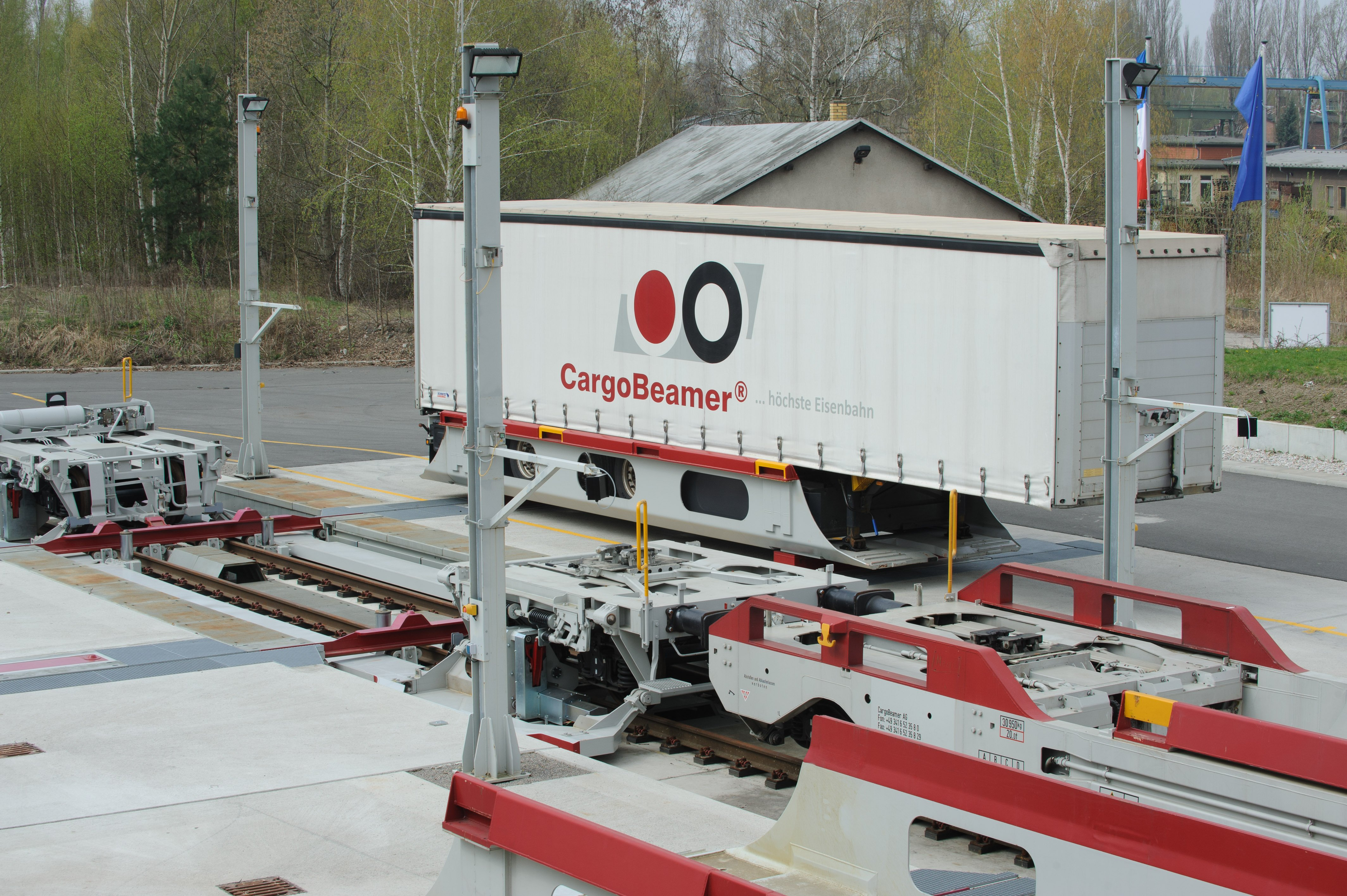
  Fully automated loading procedure of a semi-trailer in the CargoBeamer test terminal Leipzig, Germany
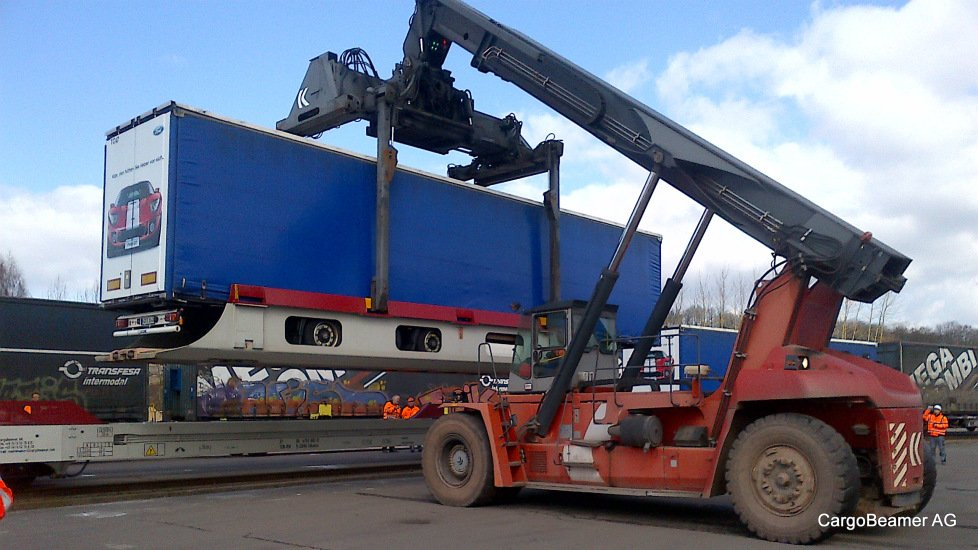
  Loading procedure of semi-trailer onto a CargoBeamer rail wagon by reach stacker
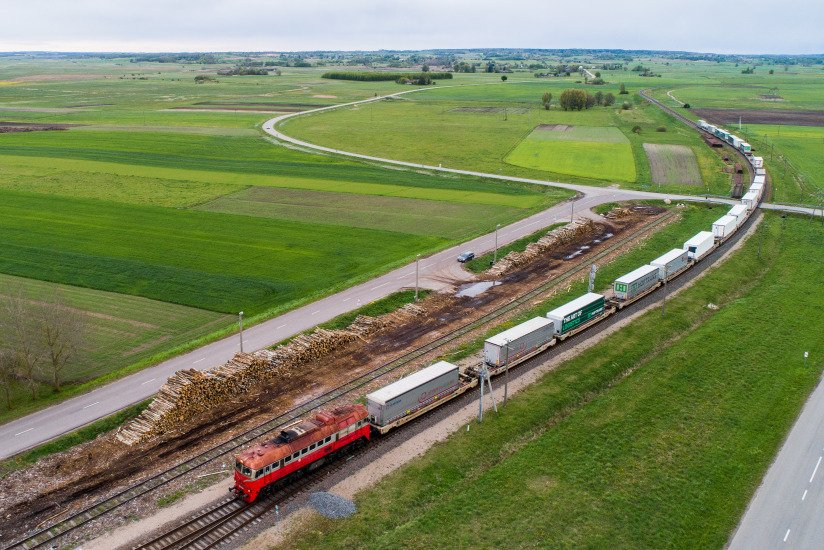
  CargoBeamer train between Lithuania and Germany, May 2020
