= Rolling highway =

Process of shipping loaded trucks on railway cars

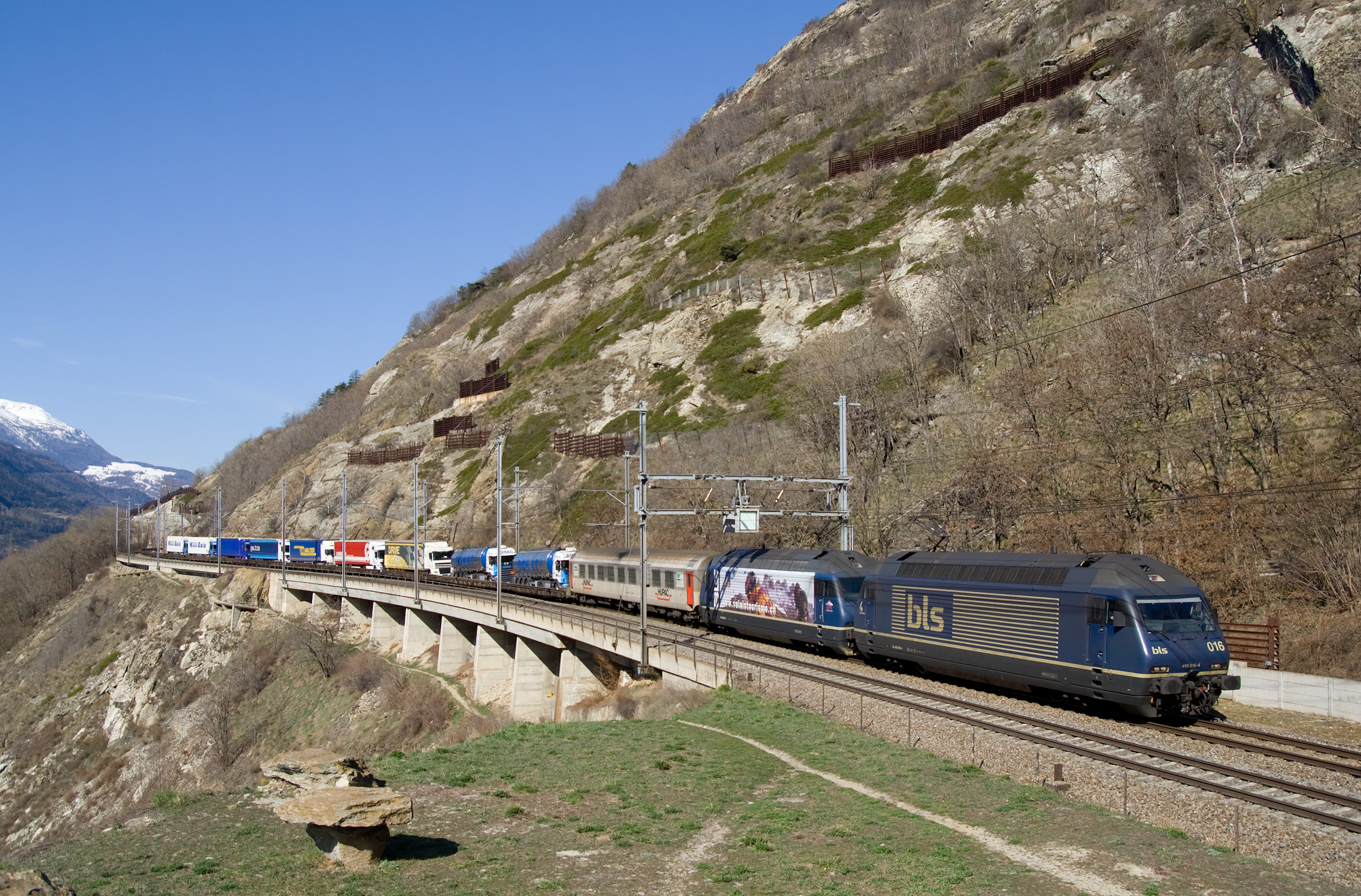
Rolling highway on the southern Lötschberg ramp, pulled by two BLS Re 465

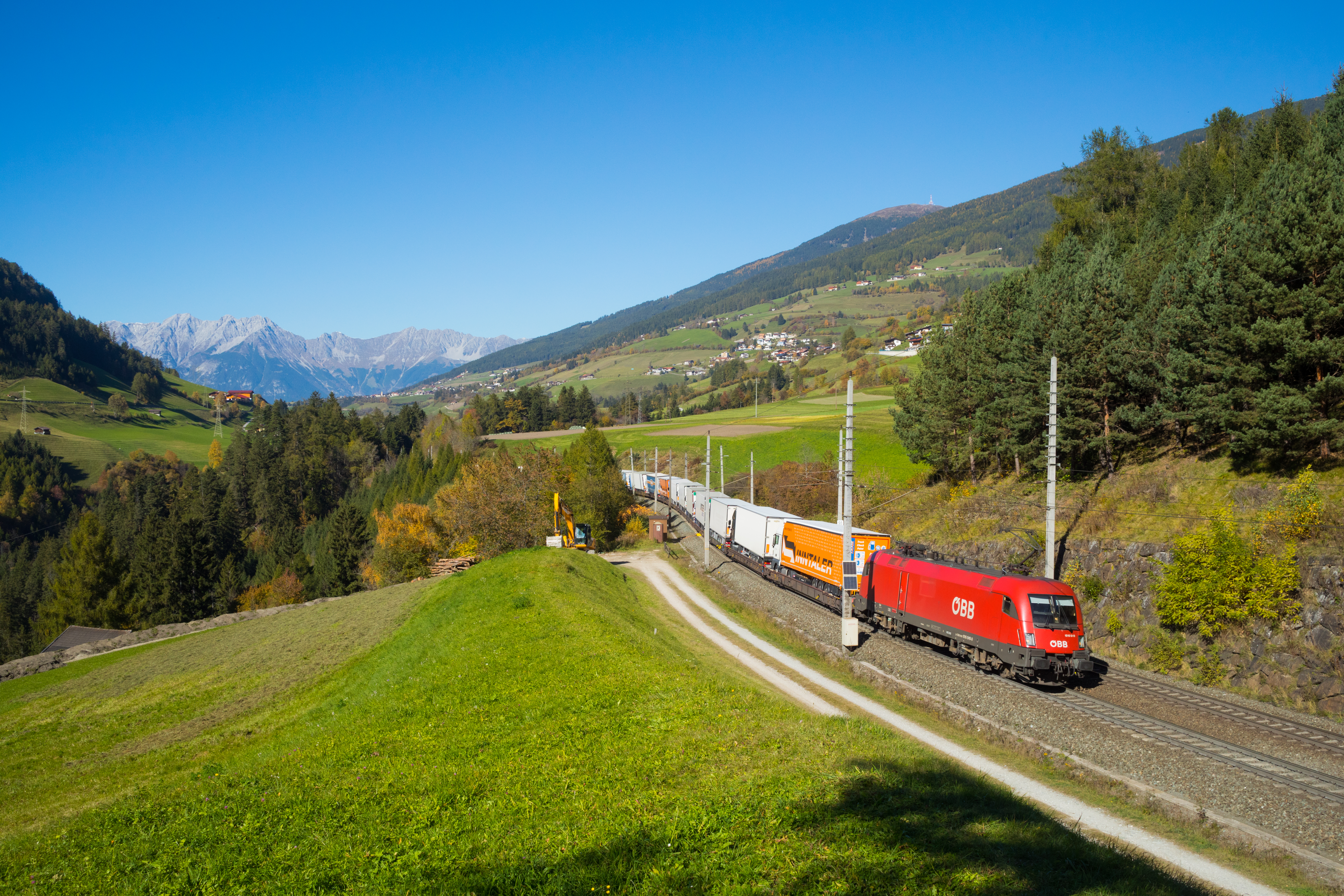
ÖBB Class 1016 using Niederflurwagen banking a rolling highway on the Brenner Railway in Matrei am Brenner

In rail transportation, a rolling highway or rolling road is a form of combined transport involving the conveying of road trucks by rail, referred to as Ro-La or ROLA trains (from the German expression "Rollende Landstrasse"). The concept is a form of piggyback transportation.

The technical challenges to implement rolling highways vary from region to region. In North America, the loading gauge is often high enough to accommodate double stack containers, so the height of a semi-trailer on a flatcar is no issue. However, in Europe, except for purpose built lines such as the Channel Tunnel or the Gotthard Base Tunnel, the loading gauge height is much smaller, and it is necessary to transport the trailers with the tires about 30 cm (11.81 in) above the rails, so the trailers cannot be simply parked on the surface of a flat car above the wagon wheels or bogies. Making the wagon wheels smaller limits the maximum speed, so many designs allow the trailer to be transported with its wheels lower than the rail wagon wheels. An early approach in France was the Kangourou wagon with modified trailers. This technology did not survive, due to the market resistance to modified trailers. Today, three designs for these special wagons are in commercial service, "Modalohr", "CargoBeamer" and "Niederflurwagen".

During a rolling-highway journey, if the drivers accompany the trailer, they are accommodated in a passenger car or a sleeping car. At both ends of the rail link there are purpose-built terminals that allow the train to be easily loaded and unloaded.

== Examples of rolling highways ==
Rolling highways are mostly used for transit routes, e.g. through the Alps or from western to eastern Europe.

=== Austria ===
In Austria, rolling highways exist from Tyrol to Italy and from Upper Austria to Slovenia. Traditionally, Austria is a transit country and therefore the rolling highway is of environmental importance. In 1999 the Austrian Federal Railways (ÖBB) carried 254,000 trucks, which equals 8,500,000 tonnes (8,400,000 long tons; 9,400,000 short tons) of load (including vehicle's weight) (158,989 trucks in 1993). The rolling highway trains in Austria are operated by Rail Cargo Austria, the cargo division of ÖBB

=== India ===
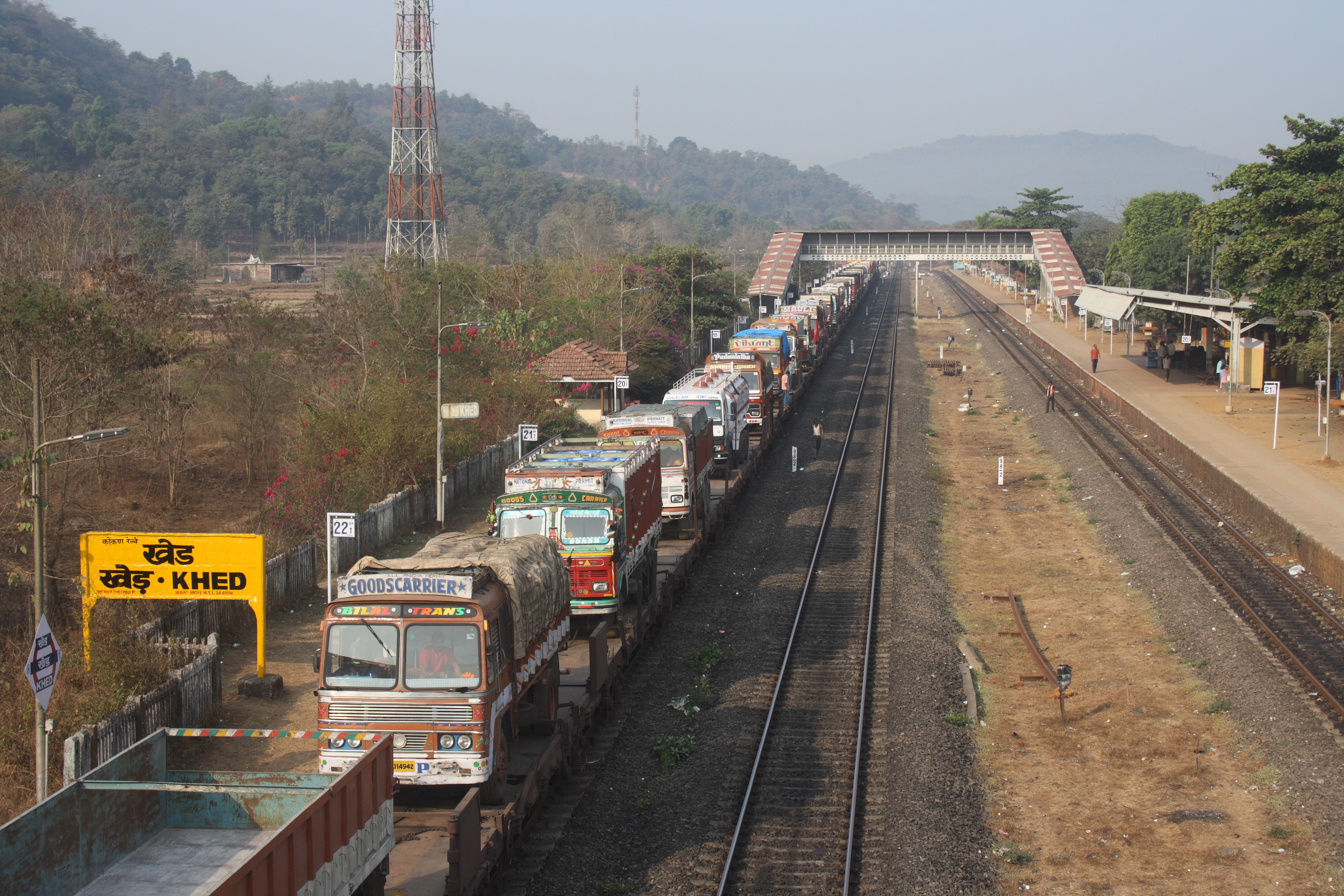
Trucks on the Konkan Railway Rolling Highway

In 1999, the Konkan Railway Corporation introduced the Roll On Roll Off (RORO) service on the section between Kolad in Maharashtra and Verna in Goa, which was extended up to Surathkal in Karnataka in 2004. The RORO service, the first of its kind in India, allowed trucks to be transported on flatcars. It was highly popular, carrying about 110,000 trucks and bringing in about ₹740 million worth of earnings to the corporation until 2007. These services are now being extended to other parts of India

=== Switzerland ===
In Switzerland, rolling highways across the Alps exist for both the Gotthard and Lötschberg - Simplon route. They are operated by RAlpin AG, headquartered in Olten. On April 15, 2015, BLS cargo launched a service between Cologne and Milan capable of transporting four-metre (13 ft) articulated lorry trailers. The RAlpin accompanied truck service will close earlier than planned at the end of 2025, citing disruptions on the German rail network

=== Italy ===
In 2018, 51% of the Ten-T network has been made adequate to P\C 80 loading gauge, required for ERA Technical Specifications for Interoperability to conveying road trucks by train. Further upgrades are underway.

=== France ===
Two rolling highways are currently in operation in France, both using French Modalohr technology: the 175 km (109 mi) Autoroute Ferroviaire Alpine, connecting the Savoy region to Turin through the Fréjus Rail Tunnel owned and operated jointly by SNCF and Trenitalia, and the 1,050 km (650 mi) Lorry-Rail which connects Bettembourg, Luxembourg, to Perpignan operated by SNCF. Lorry-Rail only carries trailers, while the AFA carries accompanied and unaccompanied trailers. Since June 2012, these two are operated under the brand "VIIA" by SNCF Geodis.

In 2013, plans were announced to add more routes in France. One was planned to link Dourges (near Lille) to Tarnos (near Bayonne) in spring 2016 and the other was an extension North from Bettembourg to Calais. Eurotunnel announced its intention to build a terminal at Folkestone to extend the Dourges-Tarnos route to the UK . However, in April 2015 the French ministry of transportation announced the cancellation of the Dourges–Tarnos route, citing financial concerns.

In July 2020, the government announced two further routes, Sète–Calais and Cherbourg–Bayonne. French Transport Minister Jean-Baptiste Djebbari confirmed in September 2021 €15m funding in 2021 for further development of autoroutes ferroviaires including Calais – Sète, Cherbourg – Bayonne and Perpignan – Rungis.

In 2025 Brittany ferries announced the start of operations between Bayonne and Cherbourg (for Poole and Rosslare).

Investment of €80m includes:

- 36 wagons
- €17m by port authorities for the Cherbourg terminal, including €3·4m to revive the branch line to the port.
- €19m by national government for a new terminal at Bayonne-Mouguerre.
- €3m by SNCF Réseau on gauge enhancement between Caen and Tours, with a further €30m in future to enlarge four tunnels to B+ loading gauge between Poitiers and Bordeaux and enable electric traction.

As of July 2025, the following routes are offered in France:

VIIA

- Calais – le Boulou (1200 km, 22h)
- Calais – Mâcon
- Calais - Sète
- Bettembourg (Luxembourg) – le Boulou
- Aiton – Orbassano

Cargobeamer

- Calais – Perpignan (1100 km, 24h)

Brittany Ferries

- Cherbourg - Bayonne

=== Other Europe ===
Cargobeamer

- Kaldenkirchen - Domodossola 23h
- Calais/Ashford - Perpignan 28h
- Stuttgart - Domodossola 18h
- Kaldenkirchen - Bari (Gateway) 50h
- Domodossola - Bari 35h

== See also ==
- Intermodal freight transport
- Roll-on/roll-off
- Roller container#ACTS intermodal transport system
- CargoBeamer
- Car shuttle train
- LeShuttle
- Modalohr
- Motorail
- Pocket wagon
- Roadrailer
- Trailer-on-flatcar
- Well car
- Class U special wagon#Intermodal container well wagons
