= Alpine rolling highway =

Key Franco-Italian rail link

The Alpine rolling highway (French: autoroute ferroviaire alpine (AFA)) is a combined transport service, in the form of a rolling highway on special wagons traveling a distance of 175 km between France and Italy by the Mont Cenis Tunnel (a.k.a. Fréjus rail tunnel).

The service has been operated since 2003 by Autostrada ferroviaria alpina (AFA), a subsidiary of SNCF and Trenitalia.

== History ==
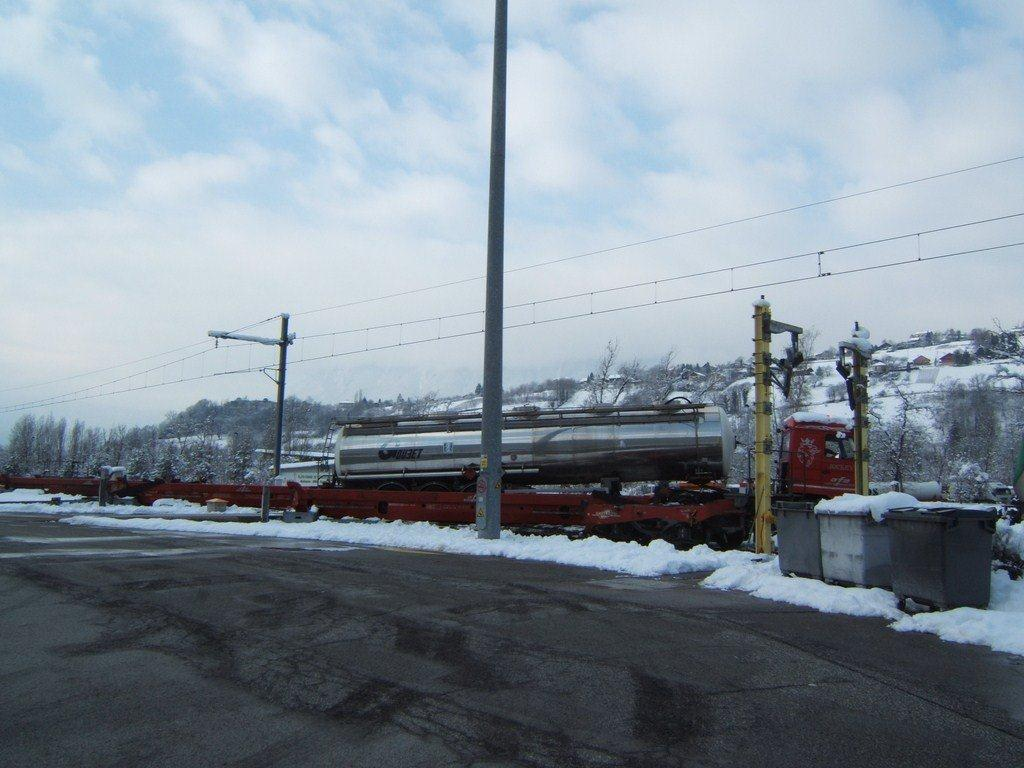
Tanker truck loading at Aiton

This service, operated from November 4, 2003 by a private company Autostrada ferroviaria alpina (AFA), a joint subsidiary of the SNCF and Trenitalia, offers four daily shuttles between two loading platforms located in Aiton (Savoie) in the Maurienne valley and Orbassano (a suburb of Turin), using the Culoz–Modane railway and the Turin–Modane railway. Given the limited loading gauge at the beginning of the service only tankers could be transported.

The Alpine rolling highway was subsidised, with the agreement of the European Union, by the French and Italian states for a trial period until 2006. In fall 2008, the fill rate approached 100% for four daily shuttles. Despite the sharp downturn in the freight transport (both rail and road), the hundred thousandth truck was carried in July 2009, and the fill rate remained relatively high (above 70%).

Following the fire in the Fréjus road tunnel on 4 June 2005 which led to the closure of the tunnel and the drastic reduction in road transit capacity across the Alps between France and Italy, including the ban on the transport of dangerous substances in the Mont Blanc tunnel, various measures were considered to increase the capacity of the service, in particular the establishment of a fifth daily rotation. However, there were constraints, including the capacity of the line at that time operated in single track mode in the Fréjus tunnel because of construction work, and the need to ensure continuity of existing rail traffic, passenger and intermodal and standard freight.

Although the Mont Cenis tunnel was modified to GB1 loading gauge in 2010, allowing the transport of trucks loaded with ISO containers, the necessary modifications on the approaches were only completed in June 2012.

This has allowed the service to replace the flagging tanker truck business with new container business. July 2012 was the all-time record month with 2788 trucks carried, beating the previous October 2008 record of 2600.

== Rolling Stock ==
Modalohr wagons, designed and built by the Alsatian company Lohr Industrie are used. These are low-floor wagons with pivoting platform for the simultaneous loading of the whole train. They can ship the complete trucks (tractors with trailers uncoupled) or trailers alone, unaccompanied, like standard rail-road intermodal.

These wagons are hauled by a series of BB 36000 locomotives modified for operation in Italy, the BB 36300. There is a passenger carriage for drivers.

== See also ==
- Piggyback (transportation)
