= Bombardier–Alstom HHP-8 =

American electric locomotive

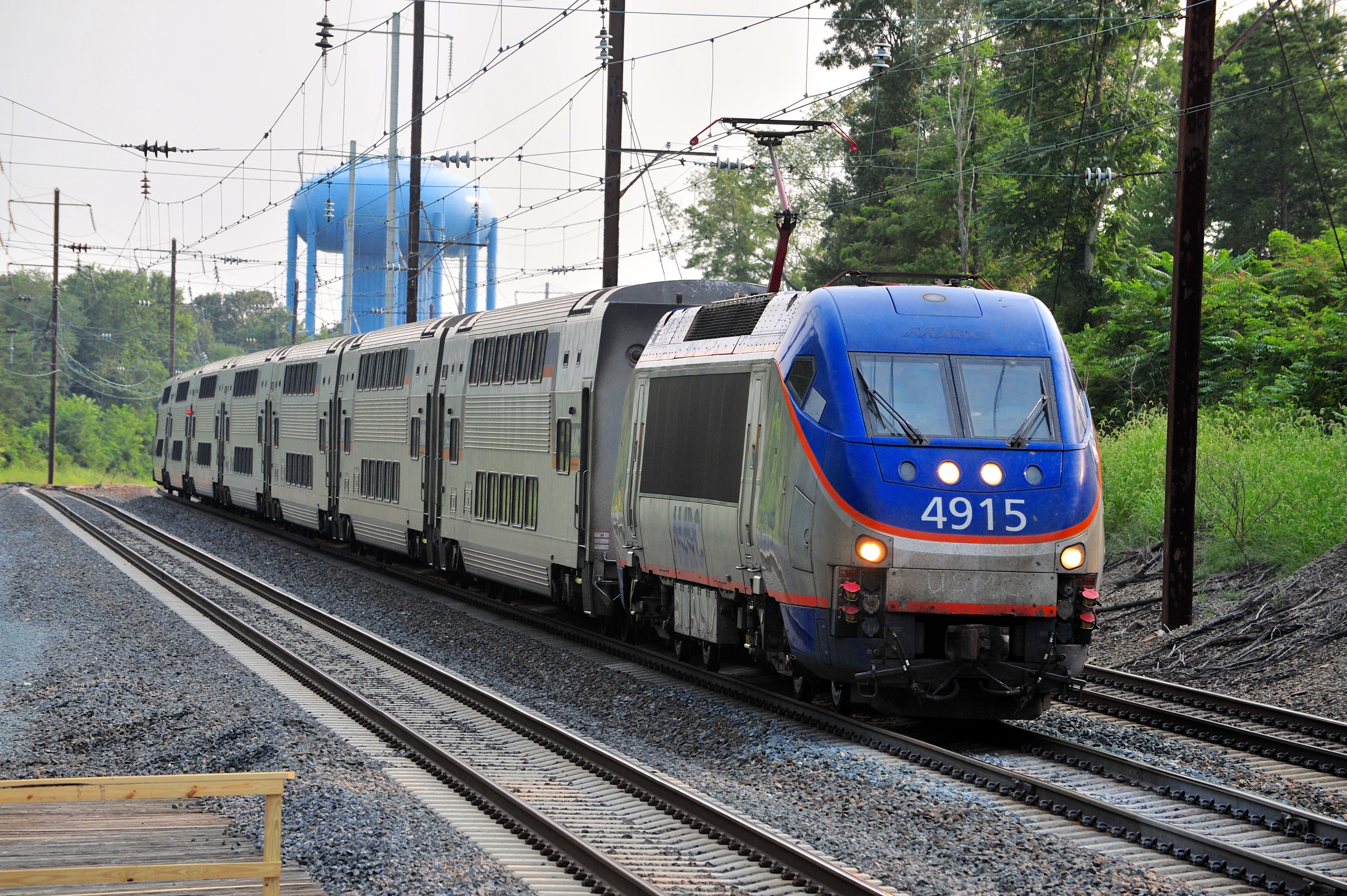
- MARC No. 4915 at Odenton in 2014
Type and origin
- Power type: Electric
- Builder: Bombardier, Alstom
- Build date: 1999–2001
- Total produced: Amtrak: 15; MARC: 6
Specifications
- Configuration
  - AAR: B-B
  - UIC: Bo’Bo’
- Gauge: 4 ft 8 1/2 in (1,435 mm) standard gauge
- Wheel diameter: 40 in (1,016 mm)
- Minimum curve: 249 ft (76 m)
- Wheelbase: 9 ft 4 in (2.84 m)
  - Truck: 35 ft 3 in (10.74 m)
- Length: 67 ft 1 in (20.45 m) over couplers
- Width: 10 ft 4 in (3.15 m)
- Height: 14 ft 2 in (4.32 m)
- Loco weight: 222,000 lb (101 t)
- Electric system/s: Overhead line: 25 kV 60 Hz AC; 12.5 kV 60 Hz AC; 12 kV 25 Hz AC
- Current pickup: Dual pantographs
- Traction motors: 4 × 1.5 MW (2,000 hp) Alstom 4-FXA-4559C
- Loco brake: Electrical: regenerative and rheostatic brakes; Friction: two disc brakes per axle
- Safety systems: Cab signals, ACSES
Performance figures
- Maximum speed: 135 mph (217 km/h)
- Power output: 6,000 kW (8,000 hp) continuous
- Tractive effort
  - Starting: 71,240 lbf (316.9 kN)
  - Continuous: 56,200 lbf (250.0 kN)
Career
- Operators: Amtrak (formerly); MARC
- Numbers: Amtrak: 680–694 (formerly 650–664); MARC: 4910–4915
- Official name: HSEL (High Speed Electric Locomotive)
- Nicknames: Hippos
- Retired: 2014 (Amtrak)
- Disposition: MARC units in service, Amtrak units stored. Some Amtrak units converted to NPCUs.
- Sources: except where noted

The Bombardier–Alstom HHP-8 (High Horse Power 8000) is a twin-cab electric locomotive built for Amtrak and MARC by a consortium of Bombardier and Alstom. Its electrical system was based on Alstom's BB 36000 locomotive.

Due to a limited number of locomotives produced and reliability issues leading to high maintenance costs, Amtrak retired all its HHP-8s after only 15 years of service. MARC initially planned to follow suit but ultimately chose to refurbish their HHP-8 fleet between 2017 and 2018.

== Background ==
Amtrak assumed control of almost all private sector intercity passenger rail service in the United States on May 1, 1971. The centerpiece of Amtrak's system was the Northeast Corridor, a 457-mile (735 km) line between Washington, D.C., and Boston, Massachusetts, via New York City. The line was electrified from Washington through New York to New Haven, Connecticut; diesel locomotives handled trains over the remaining 157 miles (253 km) between New Haven and Boston. In the 1990s Amtrak rebuilt and electrified the route as part of the project which established high-speed Acela Express service between Washington and Boston. The extension of electrification between New Haven and Boston meant that Amtrak would need additional electric locomotives to pull conventional trains east of New Haven. Neither of Amtrak's existing designs, the EMD AEM-7 and GE E60, were still in production, and the latter was slated for retirement. Amtrak chose to have Bombardier and Alstom, makers of the Acela Express, produce a visually-similar derivative for conventional service.

== Design ==
The HHP-8 measures 67 feet 1 inch (20.45 m) long by 10 feet 4 inches (3.15 m) wide and stands 14 feet 2 inches (4.32 m) tall (from the rail to the locomotive roof, excluding the pantographs). This was 16 feet (4.9 m) longer than the AEM-7, though still shorter than the E60. The locomotive weighs 220,000 pounds (100,000 kg). The carbody is stainless steel; the locomotive has a 6 MJ crash energy absorbance structure.

Reflecting the varied electrification schemes on the Northeast Corridor the locomotives were designed to operate at three different voltages: 25 kV 60 Hz AC (used between Boston and New Haven), 12.5 kV 60 Hz AC (used between New Haven and New York), and 12 kV 25 Hz AC (used between New York and Washington). The electrical traction system is directly derived from the system used on Alstom's BB 36000 Astride locomotives; this includes four 1.5 megawatts (2,000 hp) three phase asynchronous traction motors powered by GTO based inverters, with one inverter per motor; the electric system also allows regenerative and rheostatic braking. The locomotives were designed for up to 135 mph (217 km/h) operation but are actually limited in service to Federal Railroad Administration Tier 1 standards, operating up to 125 mph (201 km/h).

== History ==
The Acela and the HHP-8
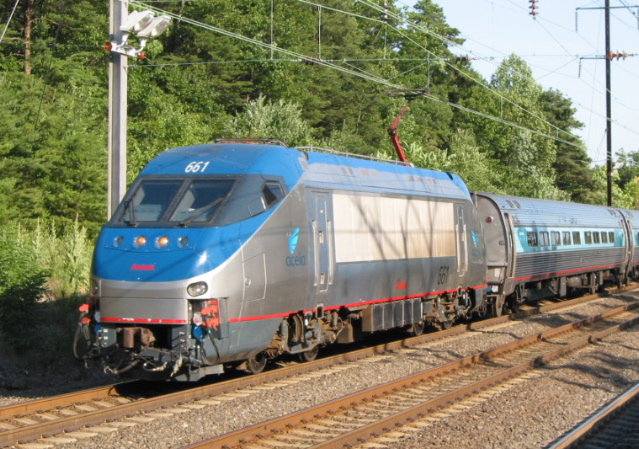

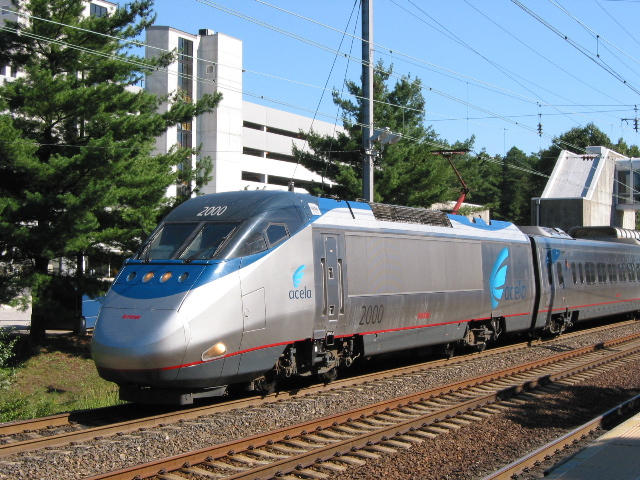
The visual similarity between the HHP-8 (top) and Acela Express power cars (bottom) was a deliberate design choice.

Amtrak ordered 15 HHP-8s in 1996 at the same time as its Acela Express trainsets. The 15 locomotives were completed between 1999 and 2001. The HHP-8s have external styling that is similar to the Acela power cars, but are designed to operate as independent locomotives, hauling conventional passenger rolling stock. The units supplemented the EMD AEM-7s and allowed Amtrak to commence retirement of the GE E60. Amtrak did not purchase the locomotives outright but leased them from Philip Morris Capital.

The locomotive's original type designation was HHL-8, for "High Horsepower Locomotive, 8,000 (nominal) horsepower". This was subsequently changed to HHP-8.

In conjunction with the Amtrak order, MARC also acquired six HHP-8s, which MARC uses on their Penn Line service along the Northeast Corridor between Perryville and Washington, DC.

Amtrak operated its HHP-8s on the Northeast Corridor between Boston and Washington, DC; racking up approximately 1,000,000 miles each in service (based on 2009 figure).

In 2002, Amtrak's fleet of 15 units was temporarily withdrawn along with the Acela Express trains due to cracks in components of the trucks.

=== Amtrak retirement ===
Amtrak's HHP-8s suffered from low reliability. As a result, after only one decade in service, their replacement was considered, concurrent with the replacement of the older AEM-7 locomotive fleet, since a large order for a standardized fleet would have price economies, and the resultant fleet would have lower overall maintenance costs. A replacement fleet of 70 locomotives starting delivery in 2012 was planned, with HHP-8s kept as a reserve in the short term.

In October 2010, Amtrak ordered 70 Siemens ACS-64 locomotives to replace both the HHP-8 and the older AEM-7 locomotives, with deliveries beginning in early 2013. Amtrak retired its last HHP-8 on February 9, 2015. All units are now stored; to avoid duplicate numbering with ACS-64 units 650–664, Amtrak renumbered its retired HHP-8s to 680–694. Philip Morris sued Amtrak in 2019, alleging that Amtrak had cannibalized eight of the fifteen locomotives for parts, in violation of the terms of the lease. The two parties settled the lawsuit in 2021; the terms were not disclosed.

==== Amtrak conversion to cab cars ====
In an effort to extend the life of its existing fleet until the arrival of the Airo fleet, Amtrak began testing a converted HHP-8 locomotive as a cab car in 2023. These converted units are designated as HHP-8C.

The project initially aimed to convert two locomotives for expanded Ethan Allen Express service in 2022. While the first conversion (originally numbered 691, initially renumbered 90691 and later 9750) faced initial setbacks, it was ultimately successful. As of July 2024, Amtrak is considering expanding the program to include up to eight total conversions.

=== MARC refurbishment ===
While reports in 2016 indicated that MARC planned to retire their HHP-8 locomotives and replace them with Siemens Charger locomotives, MARC instead started a refurbishment program for its HHP-8s in 2017. Issues with equipment cooling that kept the HHP-8 locomotives from properly working were addressed.

As of September 2017, the first HHP-8 reconditioned under this program had been delivered and was undergoing successful testing.

As of March 2018, the first HHP-8 reconditioned was running for three weeks without major issue (a software issue was corrected in this time).

As of June 2018, the second HHP-8 had the most unreliable power control components replaced and was back in service. The remainder of the upgrade on this locomotive was to be done by the end of 2018. MARC planned to upgrade the remaining HHP-8 locomotives in their fleet.

As part of a joint order with the MBTA in Boston, Massachusetts, MARC plans to eventually replace its remaining HHP-8 locomotives with a fleet of five catenary/battery-electric locomotives.
