= Aiton, Savoie =

Aiton Éton (Savoyard)
- Commune
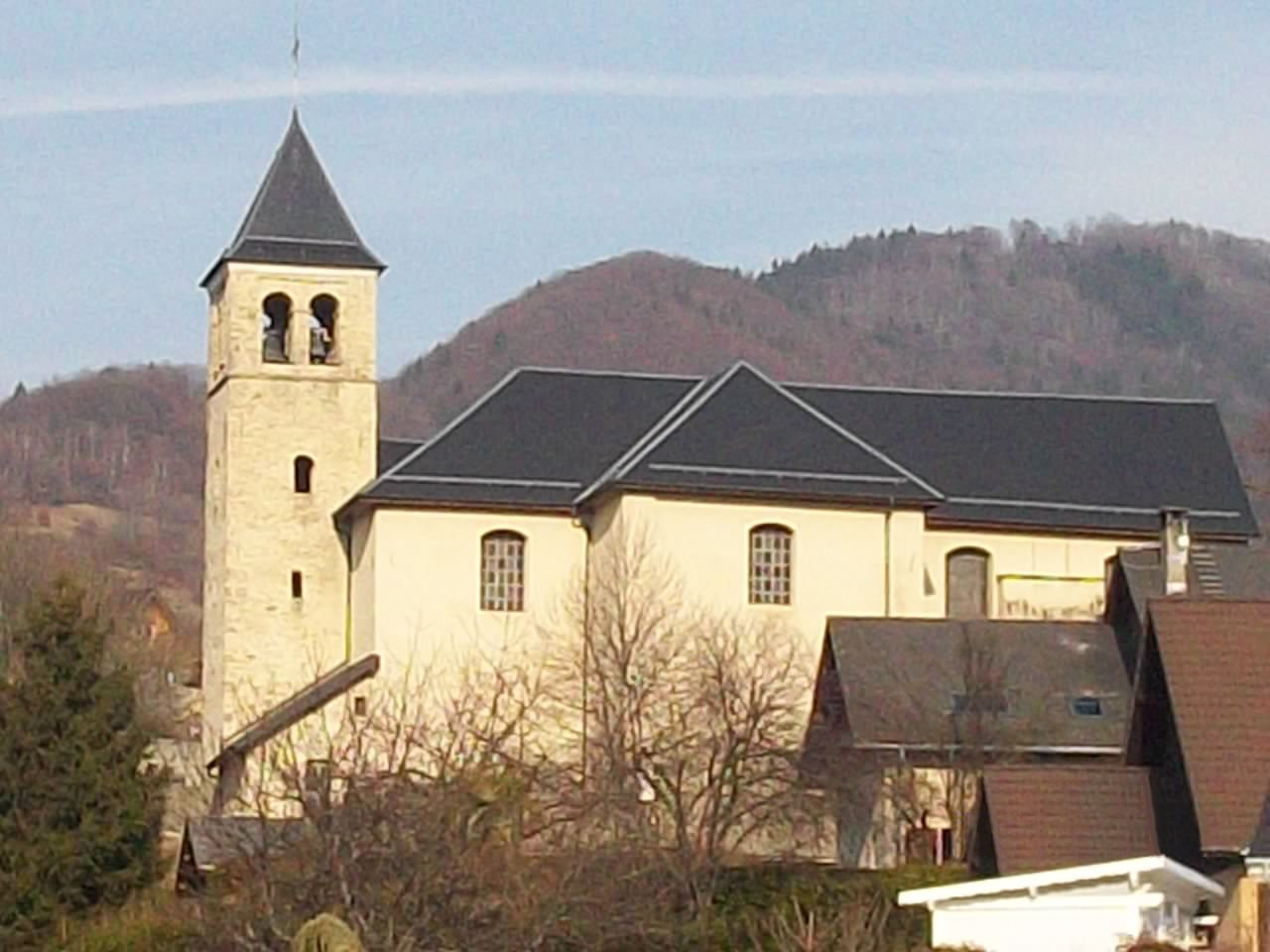
- The church in Aiton
- Location of Aiton
- Location within France Location within Auvergne-Rhône-Alpes
- Coordinates: 45°33′43″N 6°15′33″E
- Country: France
- Region: Auvergne-Rhône-Alpes
- Department: Savoie
- Arrondissement: Saint-Jean-de-Maurienne
- Canton: Saint-Pierre-d'Albigny
- Intercommunality: Porte de Maurienne

Government
  - Mayor (2023–2026): Nicolas Roche
- Area^{1}: 16.29 km^{2} (6.29 sq mi)
- Highest elevation: 1,009 m (3,310 ft)
- Lowest elevation: 286 m (938 ft)
- Population (2023): 1,874
  - Density: 115.0/km^{2} (298.0/sq mi)
- Time zone: UTC+01:00 (CET)
  - Summer (DST): UTC+02:00 (CEST)
- INSEE/Postal code: 73007 /73220
- ^{1} French Land Register data, which excludes lakes, ponds, glaciers > 1 km^{2} (0.386 sq mi or 247 acres) and river estuaries.

Aiton (Savoyard: Éton) is a commune in the Savoie department in the Auvergne-Rhône-Alpes region in south-eastern France.

== Geography ==
Aiton stands at the crossroads of the Maurienne and Tarentaise valleys, marking the transition between the foothills of the Combe de Savoie and the Alps proper. The Arc and Isère rivers have their confluence just downstream from Aiton, at the Pont Royal.

== Population ==
Historical population
Year	Pop.	±% p.a.
1968	412	—
1975	398	−0.49%
1982	516	+3.78%
1990	564	+1.12%
1999	1,163	+8.37%
2007	1,704	+4.89%
2012	1,745	+0.48%
2017	1,667	−0.91%
2023	1,874	+1.97%
Source: INSEE

== Economy ==
Aiton hosts the French loading platform for the Alpine rolling highway running under the Mont Cenis Tunnel to Orbassano near Turin.

It is also home to a prison, opened in July 1992 after serving as press accommodation for the 1992 Winter Olympics.

== See also ==
- Communes of the Savoie department
