= Modalohr =

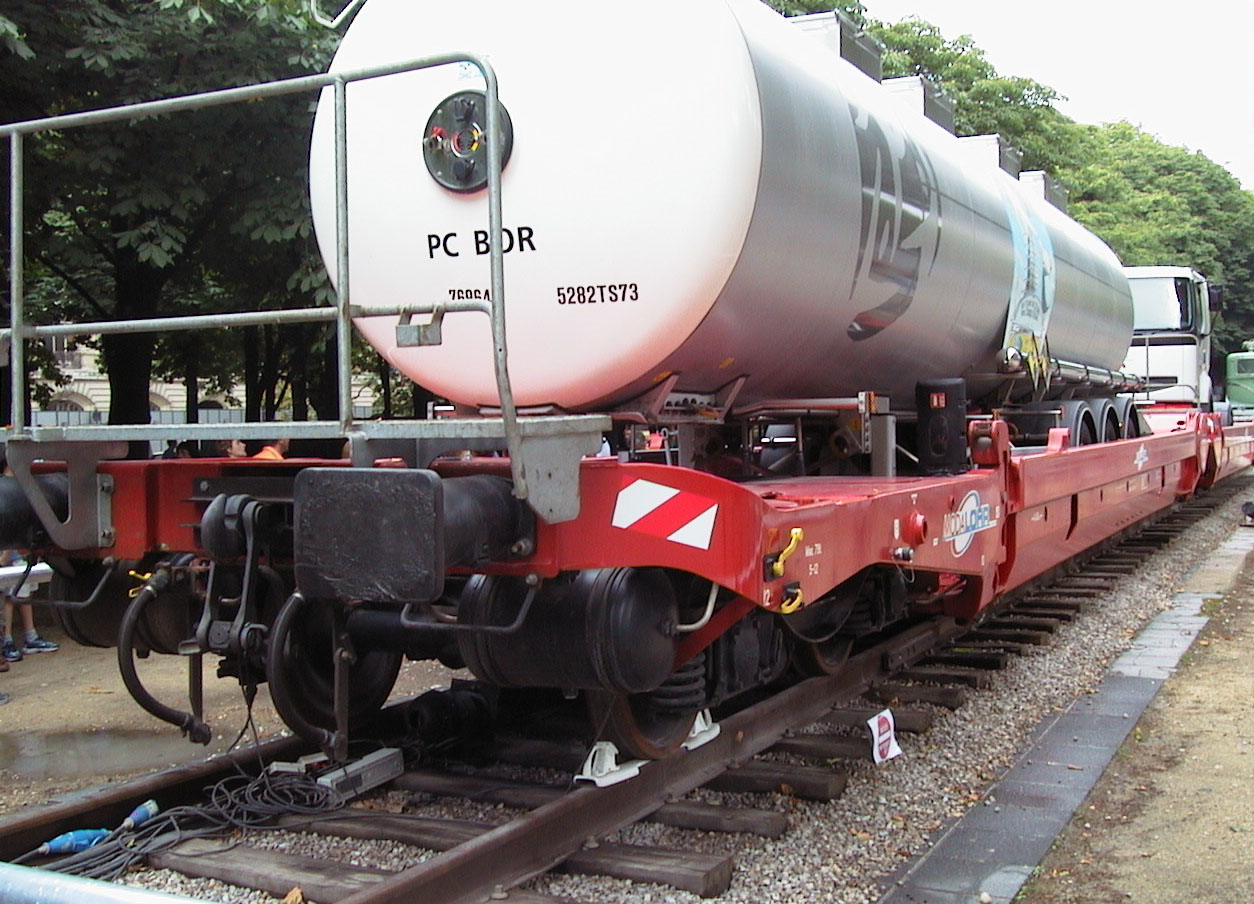
Loaded Modalohr wagon

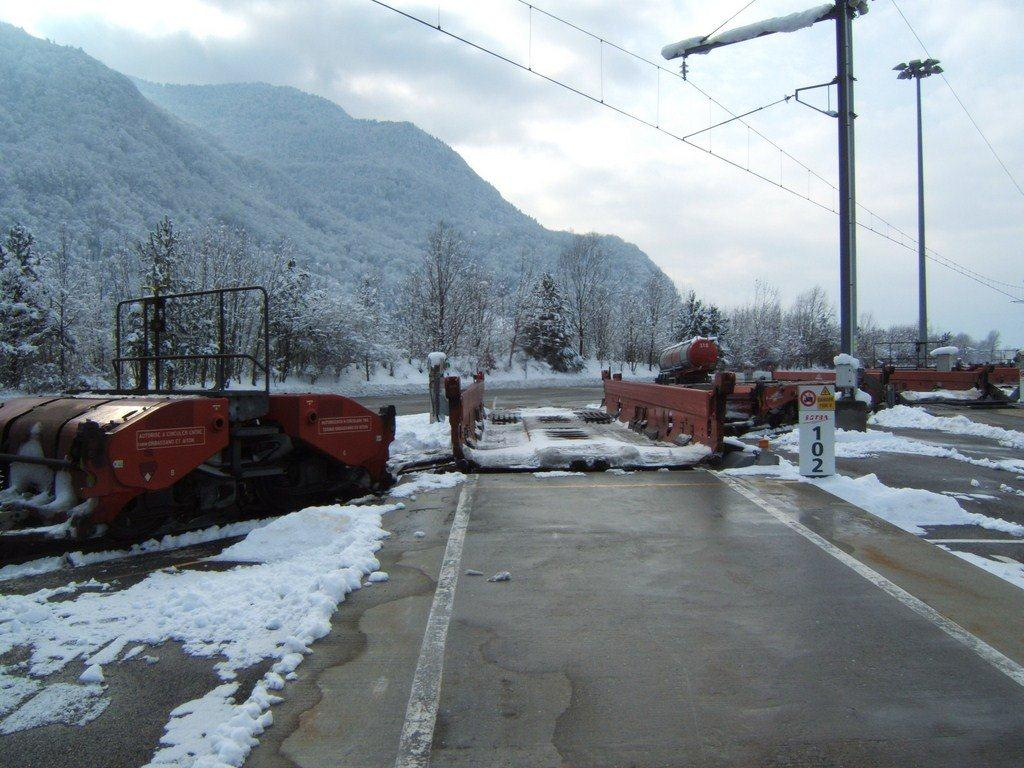
Modalohr wagon in loading position

The Lohr Railway System or Modalohr System (French: Système Modalohr) uses special railway wagons of a type known as piggyback wagons, to carry standard road semi-trailers on the European rail network. They are currently used on the AFF route from France to Italy and Luxembourg to the French border with Spain and vice versa. There are plans to expand this service. They have also been approved for the Channel Tunnel. This articulated railway wagon consists of two low-floor decks, resting on a single Y25 jacobs bogie in the middle and on two Y33 bogies on the extreme ends. Using standard bogies resulted in lower maintenance costs compared with the similar rolling highway concept. The deck between the bogies (trucks) pivots (swings) 30°, allowing the trailers to be loaded from the sides. The cars are built by Lohr Industrie.

Trailers per wagon	2
Max speed	100 km/h (62 mph)
Wagon unladen weight	34 t (33 long tons; 37 short tons)
Wagon loaded weight, unladen weight plus vehicle weight	110 t (108 long tons; 121 short tons)
Wagon length articulated car	34 m (111 ft 6 5/8 in)

== See also ==
- Lorry-Rail S.A.
- Piggyback
- Trailer-on-flatcar
- Well car
