= Lohr Industrie =

French transport manufacturer

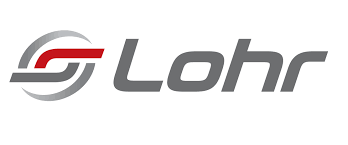
- Company type: Private
- Industry
- Founded: 1963
- Founder: Robert Lohr
- Headquarters: Hangenbieten, Grand Est, France
- Area served: International
- Revenue: in excess of 400 million Euros
- Number of employees: 1050 (May 2010); 1500 (2021)
- Website: Groupe Lohr

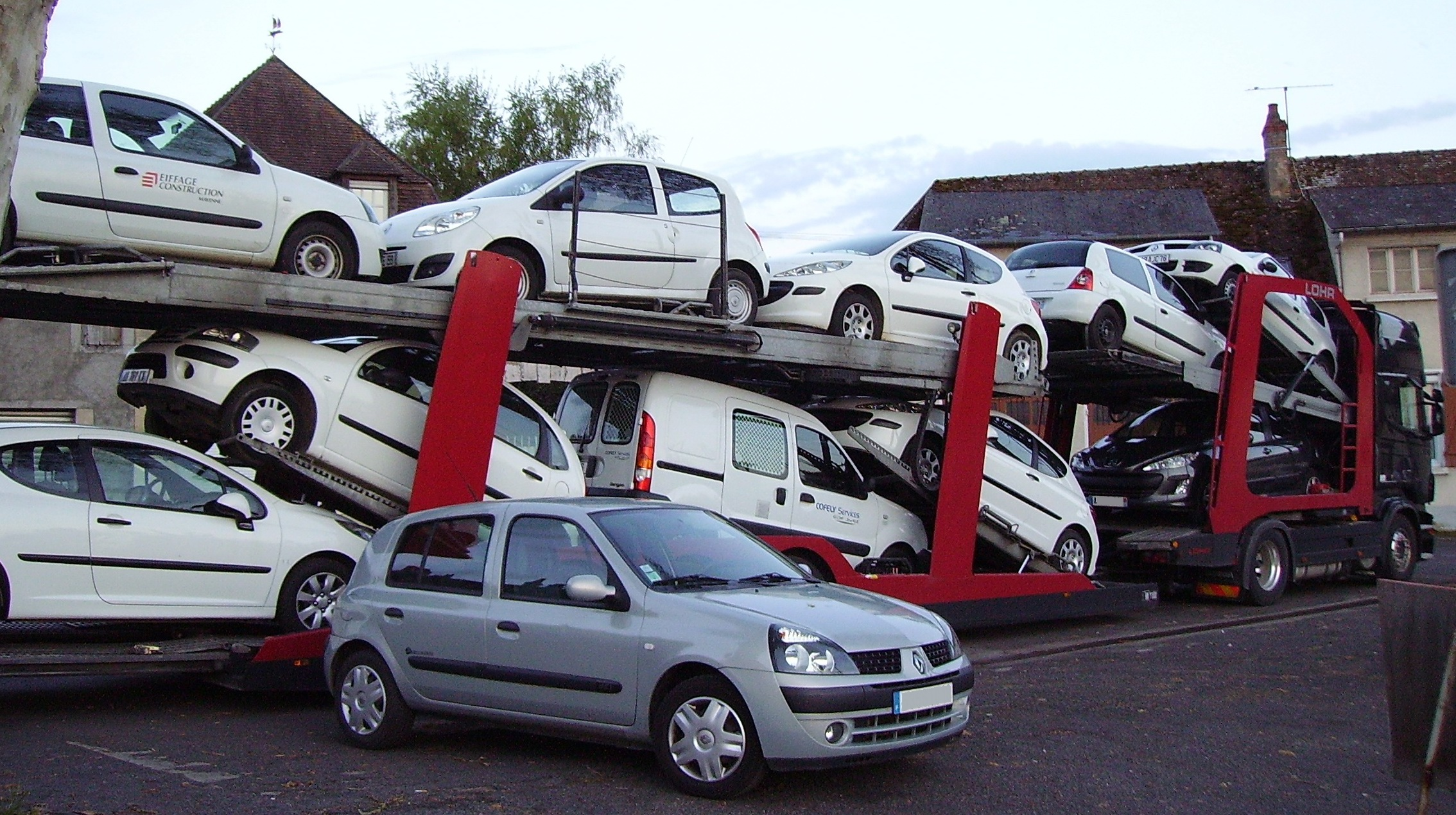
A Lohr car carrier towed by a Scania R-series truck.

Lohr Industrie is a private French group near Strasbourg, in Alsace. The Lohr Group is a global specialist in the design, manufacture and marketing of transportation systems for people and goods and is also involved in the manufacture of defense and security products.

== Core businesses ==
- Automotive: A leader in car-transporter vehicles offering a combination of reliability, performance and longevity,
- Railway System: road-rail transport reference technology with Modalohr wagons for the safe, economical transport of standard road semi-trailers on the European rail network
- New Mobilities: The company is a player in innovative, full-electric, modular and connected mobility solutions (Cristal driven shuttles). The company has launched the Draisy rail system for regional and rural public transport in 2024.
- Defense and Security: the subsidiary Soframe is specialized in the design and manufacture of tactical and logistic protected vehicles meeting the needs of armed forces and security forces.
- Lohr Service: These departments are supported by a network of technical assistance, maintenance, service contracts, spare parts networks, present and available worldwide.

In the early 2010s the company experienced financial difficulties, which led the company to sell its Translohr division (tramway on tires) to Alstom and the French state investment agency FSI (now Bpifrance), for the amount of 35 million euros. Translohr continued as NTL.

== See also ==
- Car carrier trailer
- Modalohr road car carrier trailers
- Translohr
