= Piggyback (transportation) =

One transportation unit carried on another

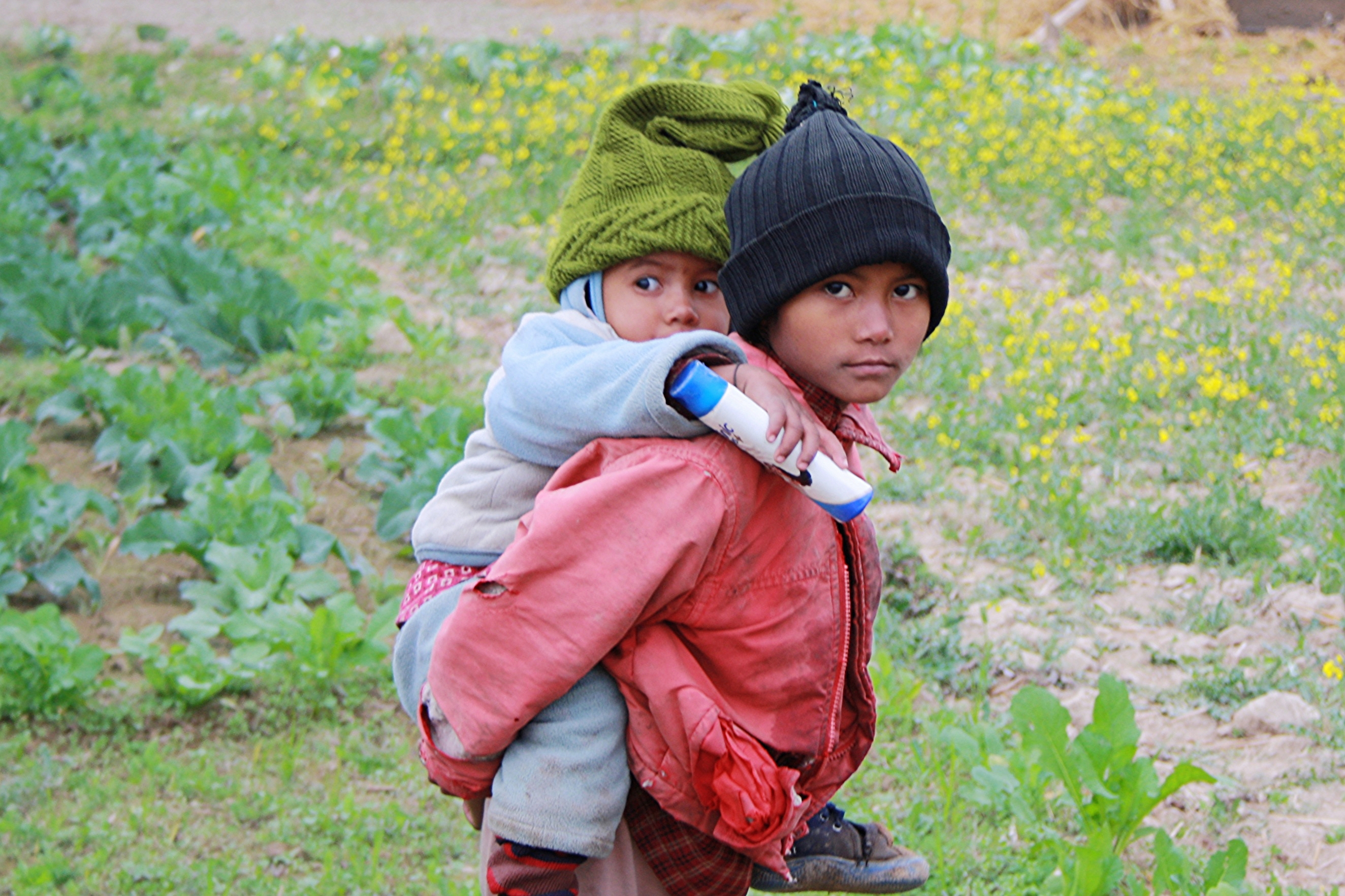
A Nepali child carries another child, "piggyback"

Piggyback transportation refers to the transportation of goods where one transportation unit is carried on the back of something else. It is a specialised form of intermodal transportation and combined transport.

== Etymology ==
Piggyback is a corruption of pickaback, which is likely to be a folk etymology alteration of pick pack (1560s), which perhaps is from pick, a dialectal variant of the verb pitch.

== Examples ==
=== Human locomotion ===
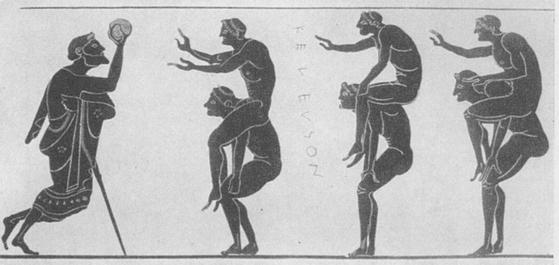
A handball game with piggybacking players in Ancient Greece circa. 500 BCE

A person carrying someone else on their back is most commonly seen in the modern day in the form of a parent carrying their child, either for travelling or for children's games. It can involve the carrier crawling on hands and knees with the child straddling over the back like riding a horse, or with the carrier standing upright with the child hugging or cradled behind the back, often with the child's arms leaning over the carrier's shoulders and legs wrapping around the flanks.

Piggybacking may also feature in the context of play or sport, and evidence of this dates back to Ancient Greece where games involving piggyback riding were combined with the requirement of catching or throwing a ball. In the modern era, wife carrying competitions, where the female participants ride on the back of their male partners running the race, are popular in some countries.

=== Rail ===
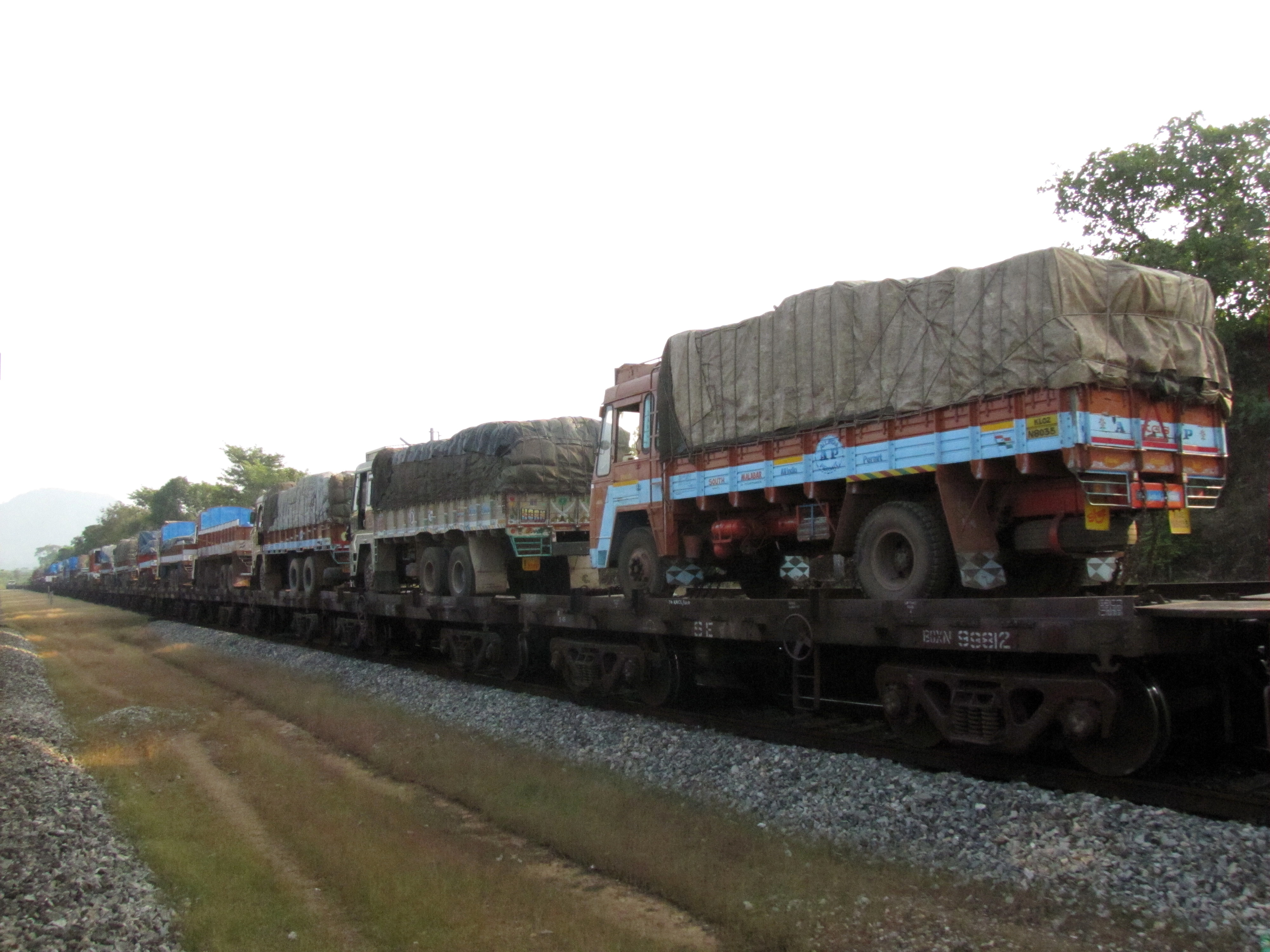
Trucks on a train in India

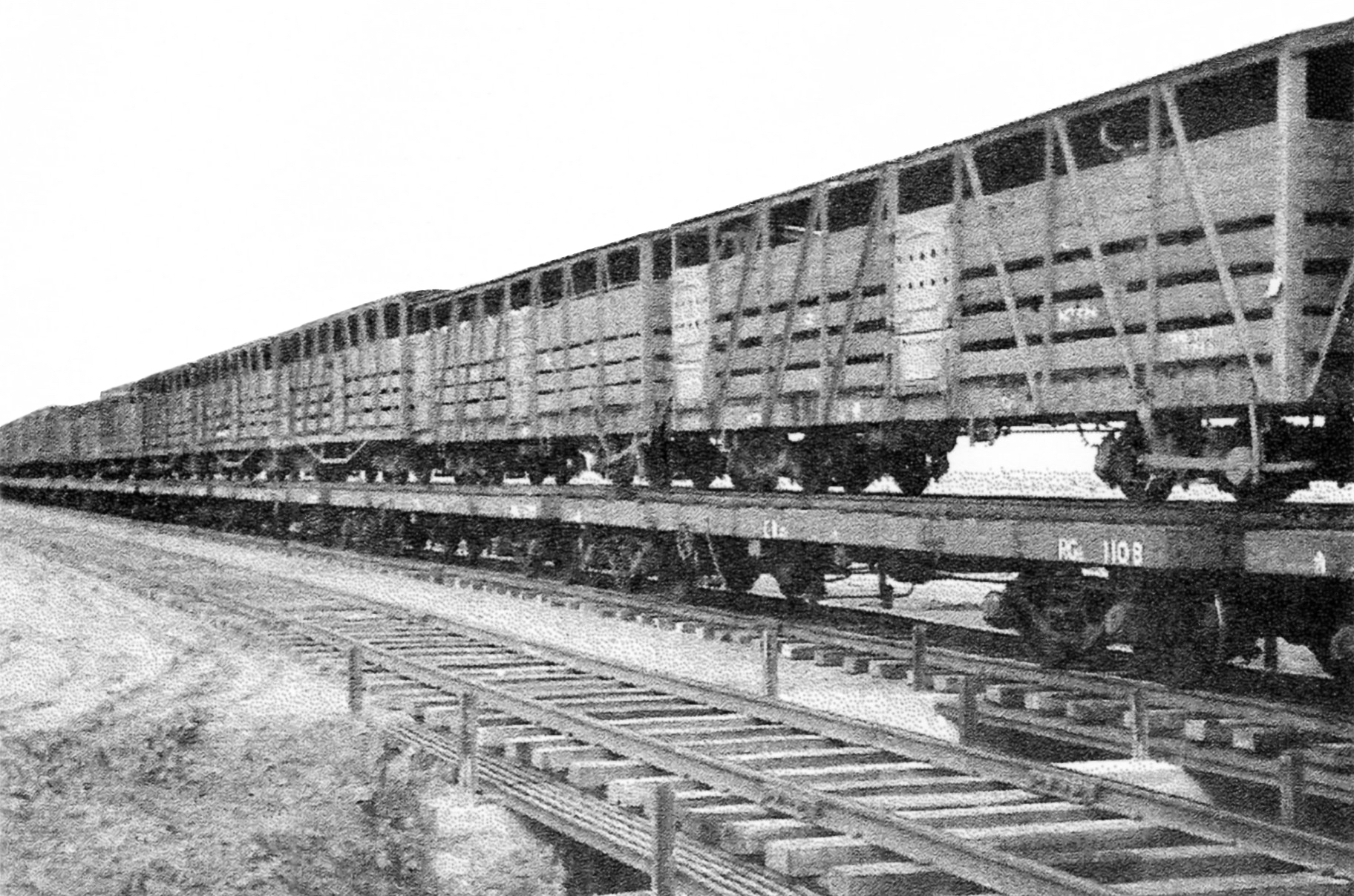
A train of coupled Commonwealth Railways narrow-gauge cattle cars on continuous rails laid on standard gauge flatcars (outback Australia)

In rail transport, the practice of carrying trailers or semi-trailers in a train atop a flatcar is referred to as "piggybacking". Early drawings of the Liverpool & Manchester Railway c1830 show road coaches being piggybacked on railway flat wagons.

The rail service provided for trucks which are carried on trains for part of their journey is referred to as a rolling road, or rolling highway. A related transportation method is the rail transport of semi-trailers, without road tractors, sometimes referred to as "trailer on flatcar (TOFC)". In the United States, TOFC traffic grew from 1% of freight in 1957 to 5% in 1964 and 15% in 1986.

A rail vehicle of one track gauge can be carried on a flatcar (transporter wagon or rollbock) of another gauge. In addition, an entire train of coupled cars of one gauge can be carried on continuous rails on a train of flatcars of another gauge. This was achieved, as a temporary expedient, by the Commonwealth Railways on the Marree railway line in South Australia between Telford Cut and Port Augusta in the mid-1950s. Japan Railways planned a similar "Train on Train" scheme, but at much higher speeds, to operate from 2016.

=== Trucking ===
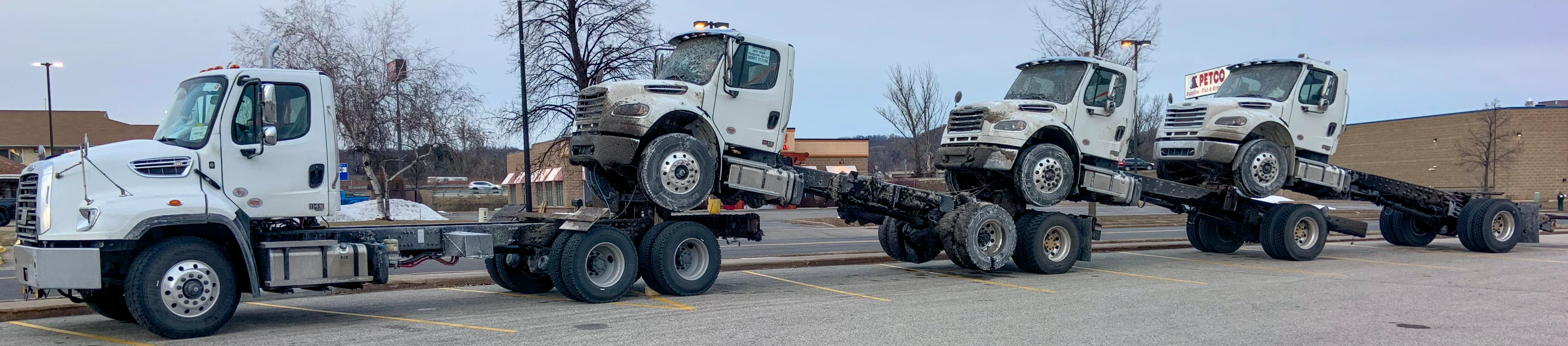
Piggyback trucking

For semi trucks the trucks can be stacked 4 deep if it is just a day-cab truck and only 3 deep if it has a sleeper-cab. The trucks drive up a ramp or are lifted into place by a tow hook on the front bumper, from a heavy-duty tow truck or overhead crane. A saddle is placed on the fifth-wheel, that the front axle of the next truck is attached to, which is called decking. The mirrors are folded in on the trucks being hauled for width requirements and safety. For undecking the trucks, a tow truck or overhead crane is used again. It is typically used to transport newly built or purchased trucks.

=== Marine ===
Small ships of all kinds can be piggybacked on larger ships. Examples include lifeboats, landing craft, and minesweepers on motherships, as well as midget submarines on larger submarines, such as those used for the 1942 Japanese submarine attack on Sydney.

=== Microcontrollers ===
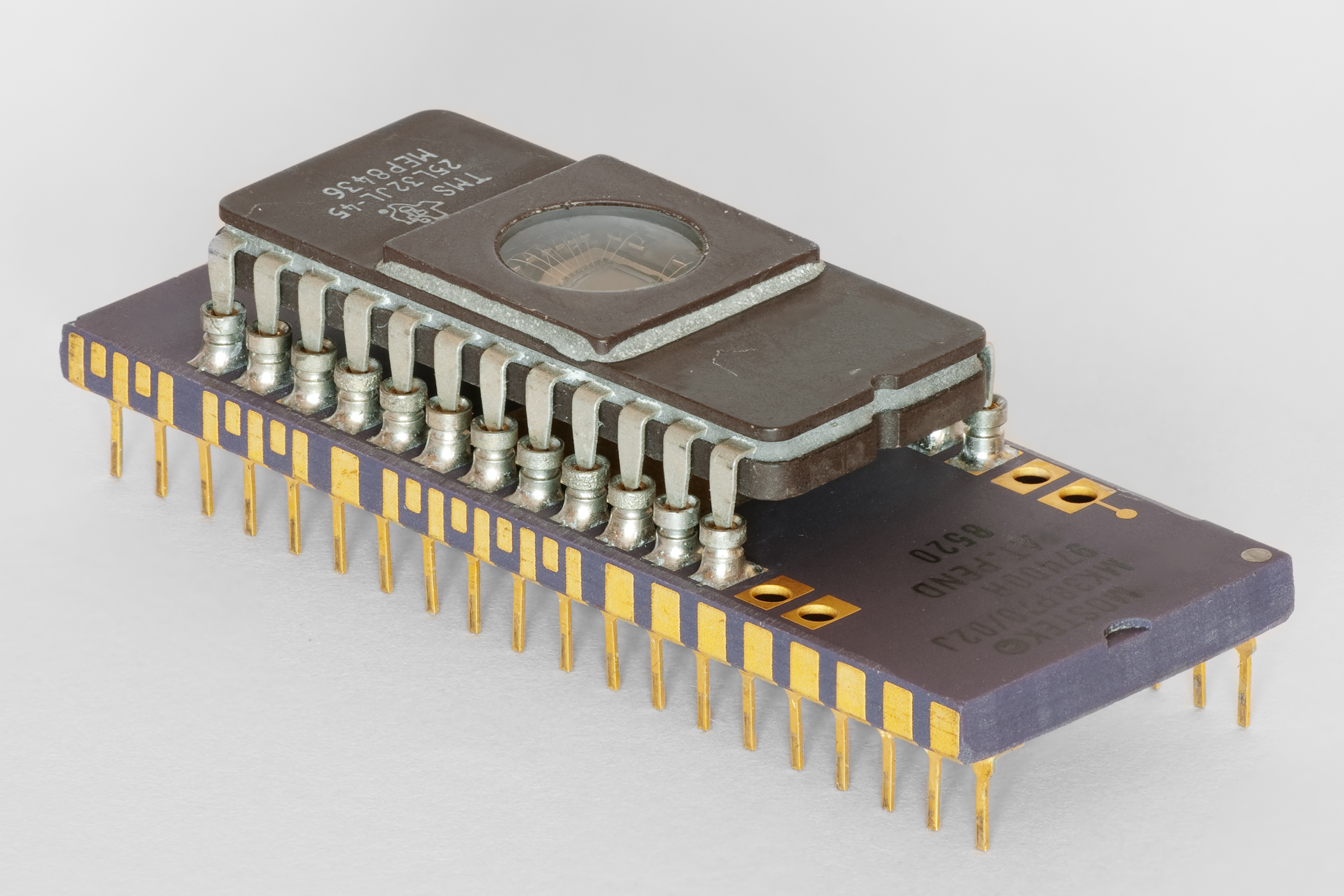
Piggyback microcontroller from MOSTEK

A piggyback microcontroller refers to a type of microcontroller setup where an external memory chip, typically an EPROM, is mounted directly on top of the microcontroller chip—often via a socket. This configuration allows for easy swapping or reprogramming of the firmware without replacing the entire microcontroller.

=== Air transport ===
The 1930s British Short Mayo Composite, in which a smaller, four-engine floatplane aircraft named Mercury was carried aloft on the back of a larger four-engine flying boat named Maia, enabled the Mercury to achieve a greater range than would have been possible had it taken off under its own power. The American Space Shuttle was carried on top of specially-modified Boeing 747 Shuttle Carrier Aircraft when the shuttle landed at places other than Kennedy Space Center.

=== Space ===
In space transportation systems, a smaller satellite that is carried as a secondary payload on a launch is said to be "piggybacked" on the main launch. It is often the case of small satellites and cubesats, since they can not usually afford accessing space on a dedicated launch and they choose instead to take profit of the remaining payload capacity in a big satellite launch. However, this is usually at the cost of not being able to fly to their desired orbit and having to remain on a similar orbit to that of the big satellite.

=== Military ===
The metal caterpillar treads of a tank wear out quickly when travelling long distances on ordinary roads. Also, tracked vehicles seriously damage the tarmac layer of ordinary roads (unless the caterpillar treads are specially fitted with rubber pads to avoid this). It is therefore necessary to provide tank transporters, which have rubber tires, to the battlefield.

== Gallery ==
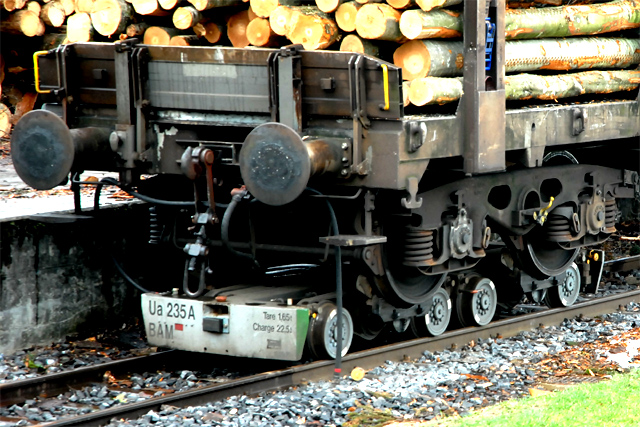
Timber wagon on rollbocks

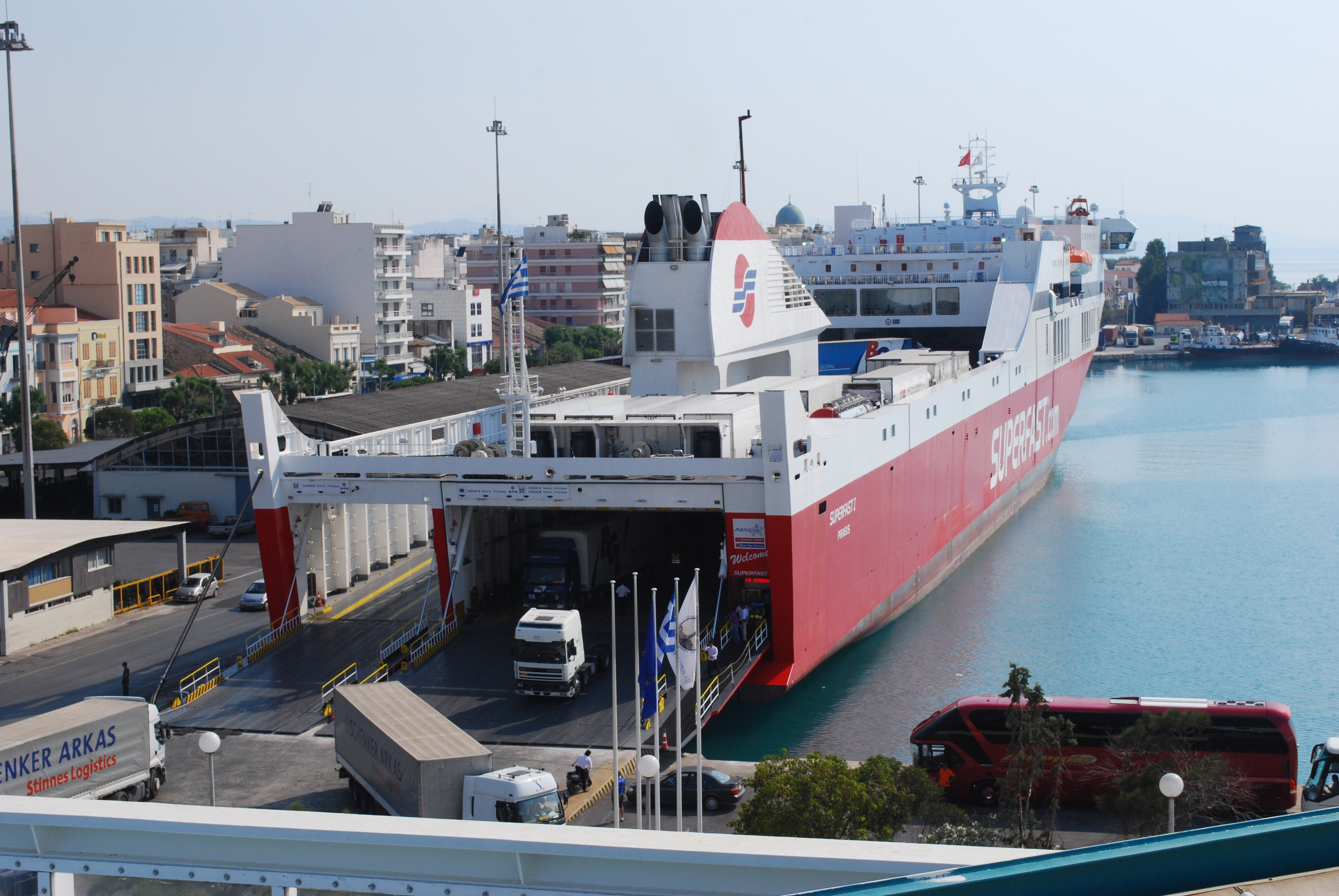
Trucks on board a ro-ro ship

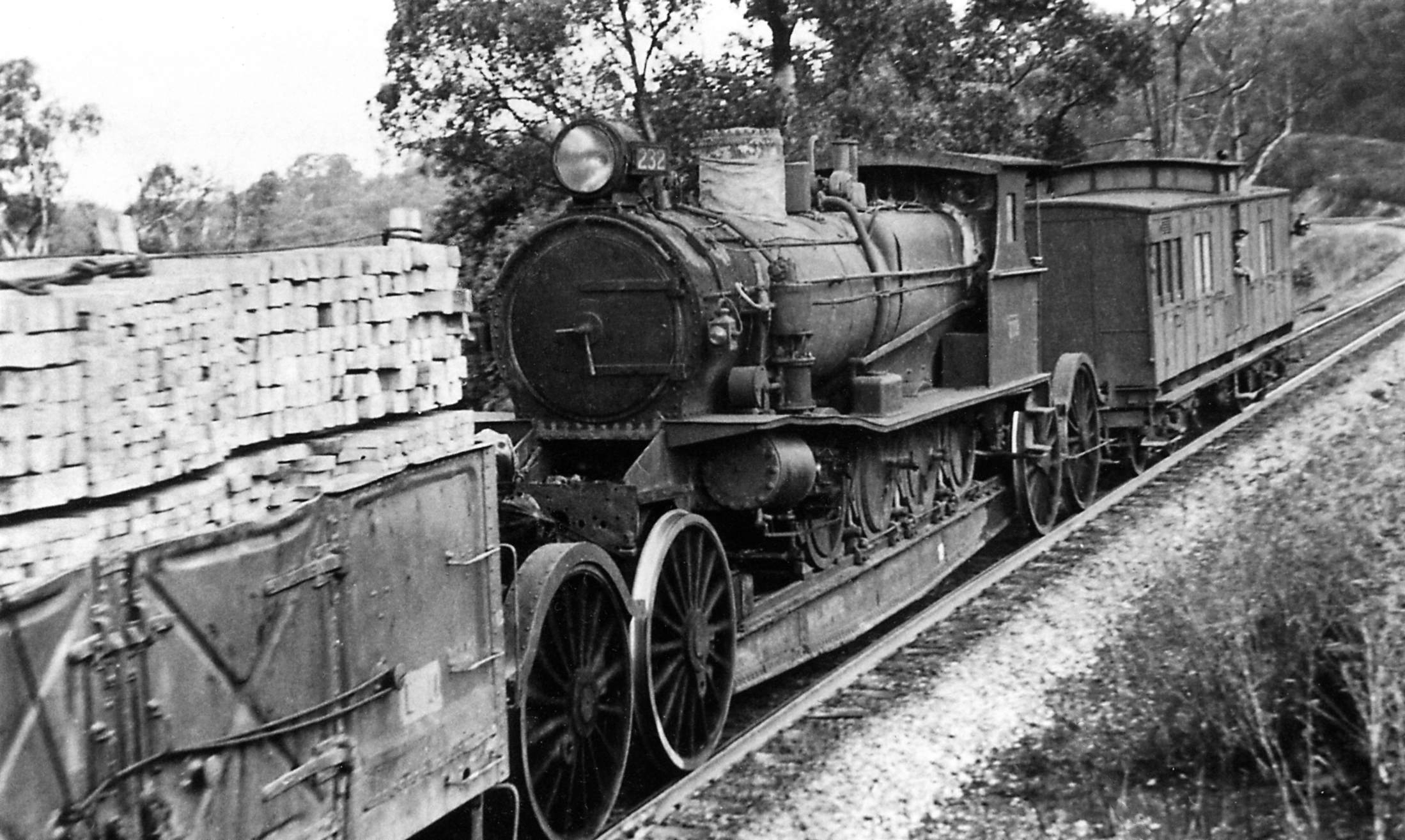
A South Australian Railways T class narrow-gauge locomotive on a broad-gauge crocodile car

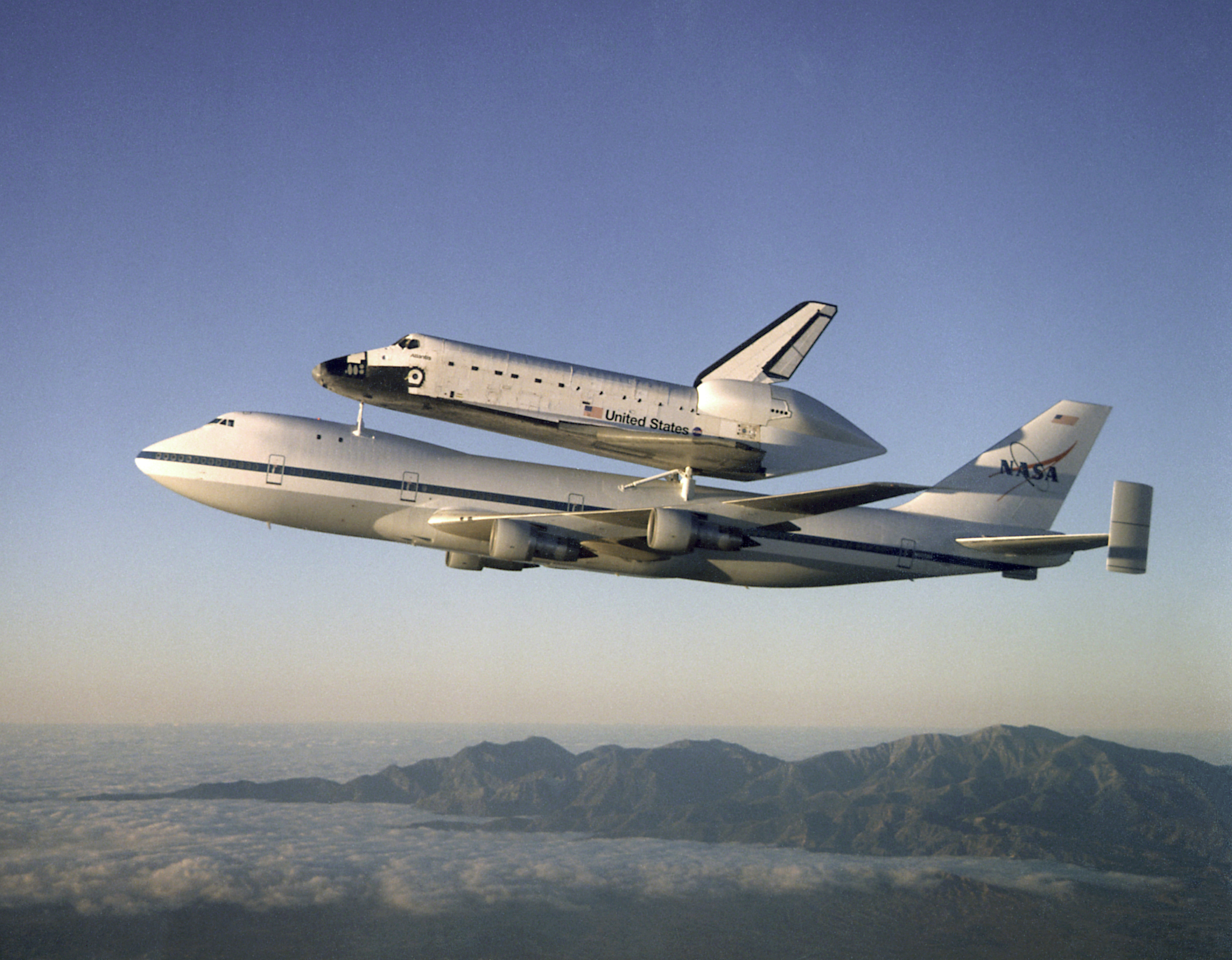
The Space Shuttle Atlantis atop a NASA Boeing 747

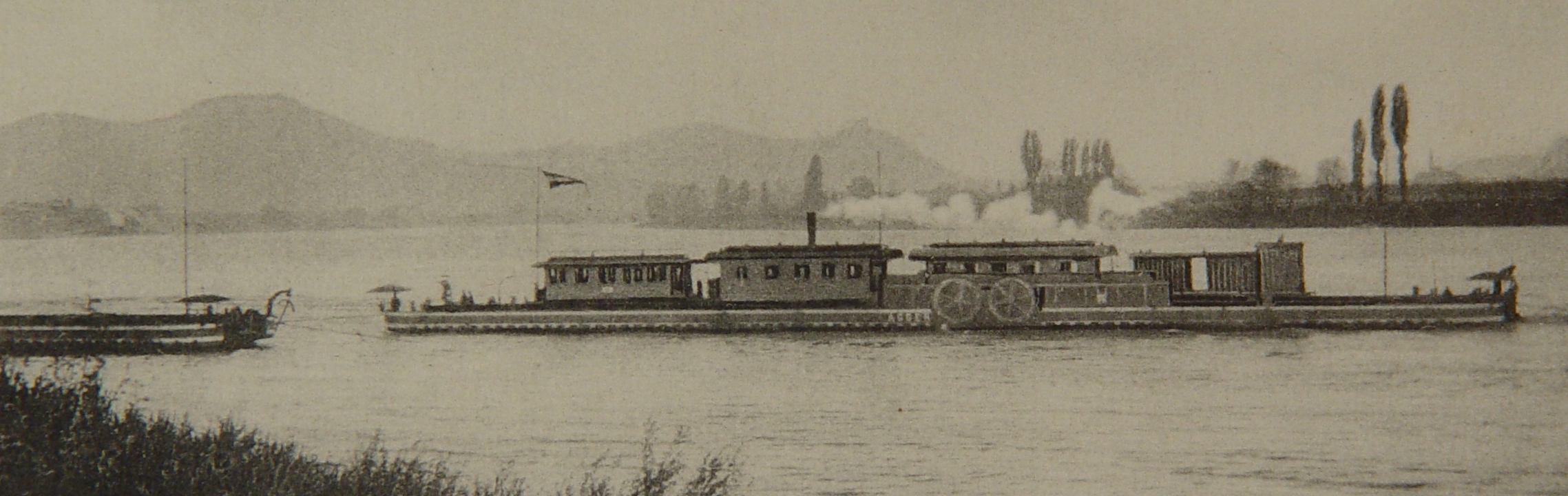
Bonn–Oberkassel train ferry

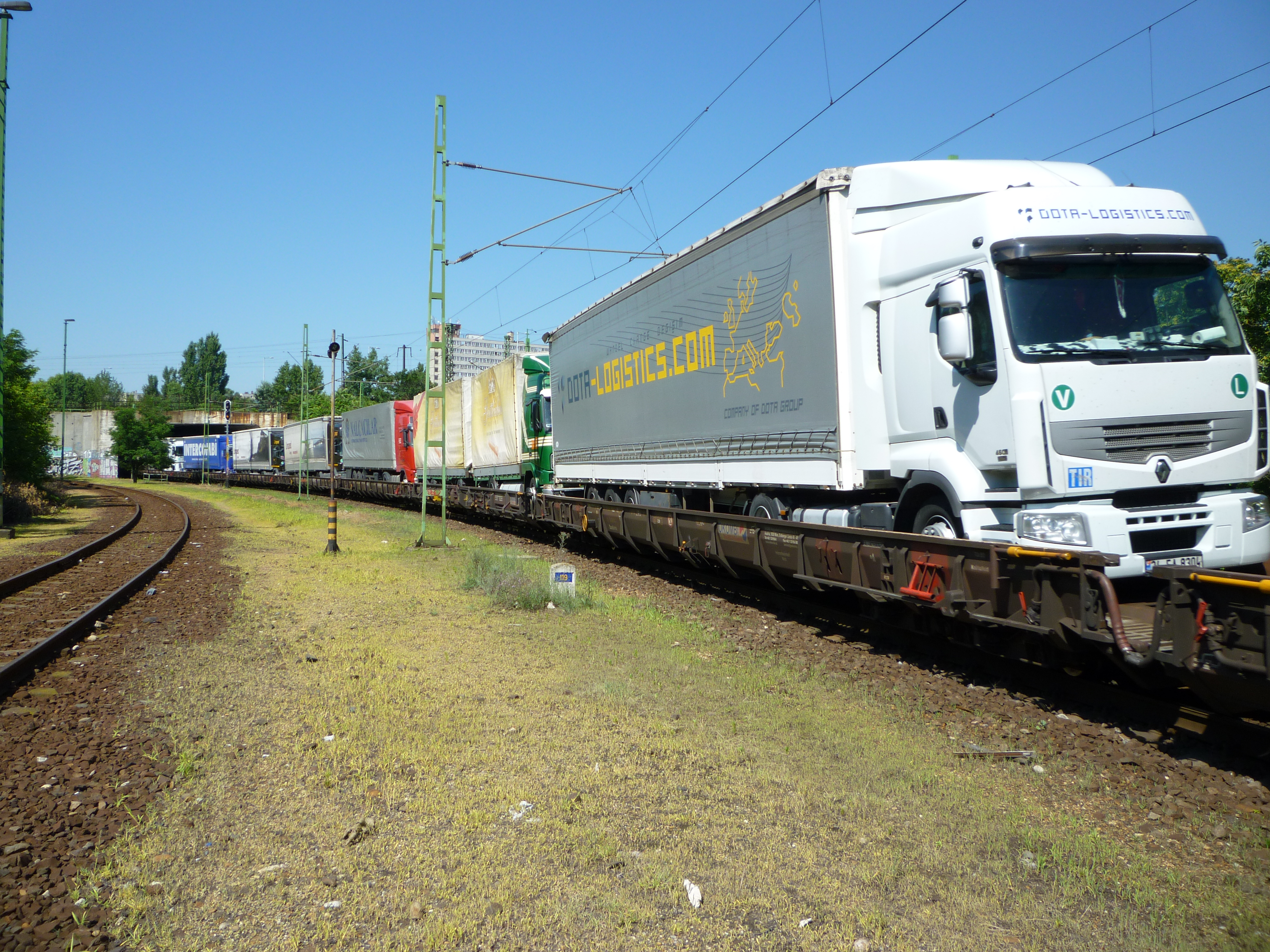
Rolling road

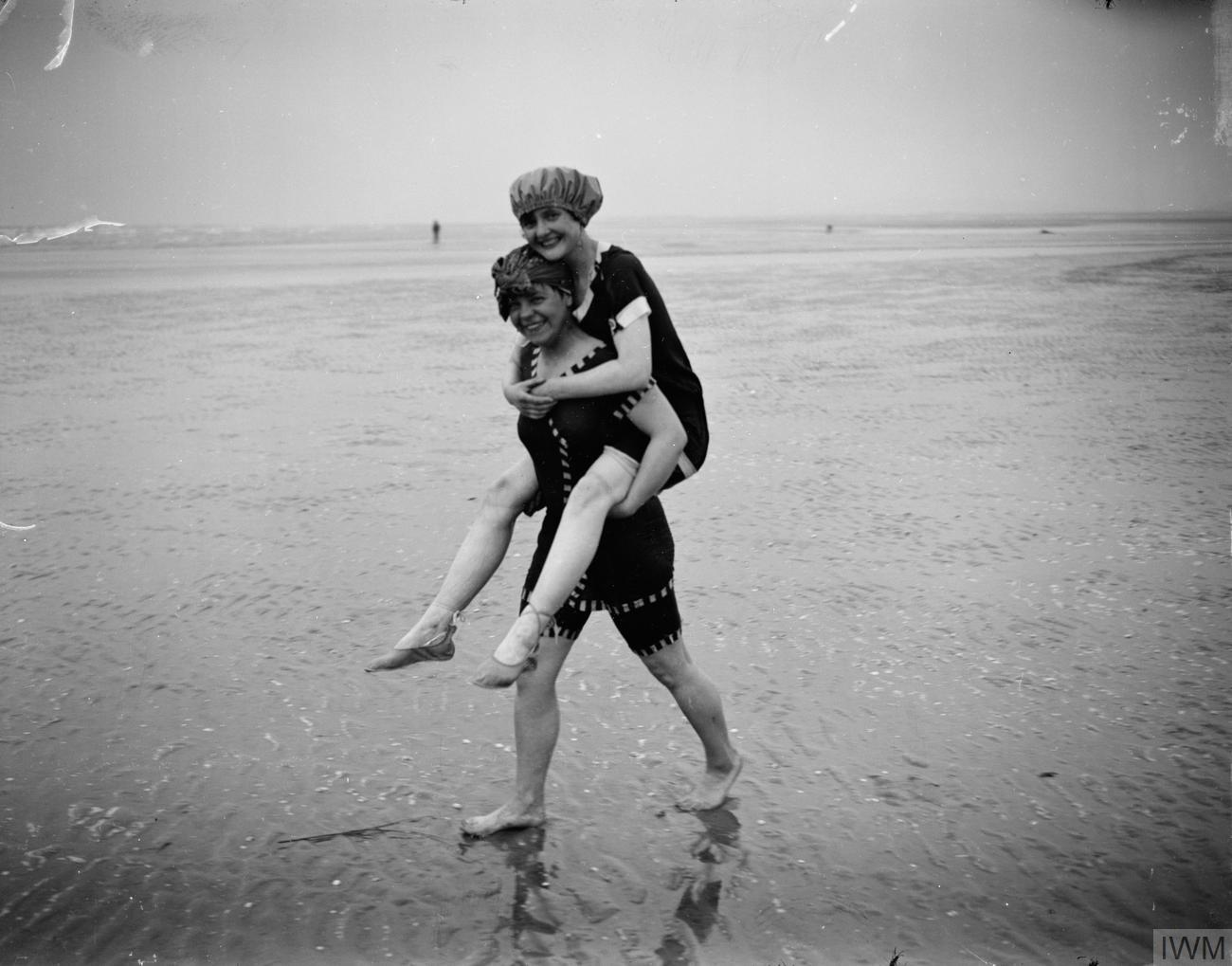
A person being carried piggy-back at the beach (1918)

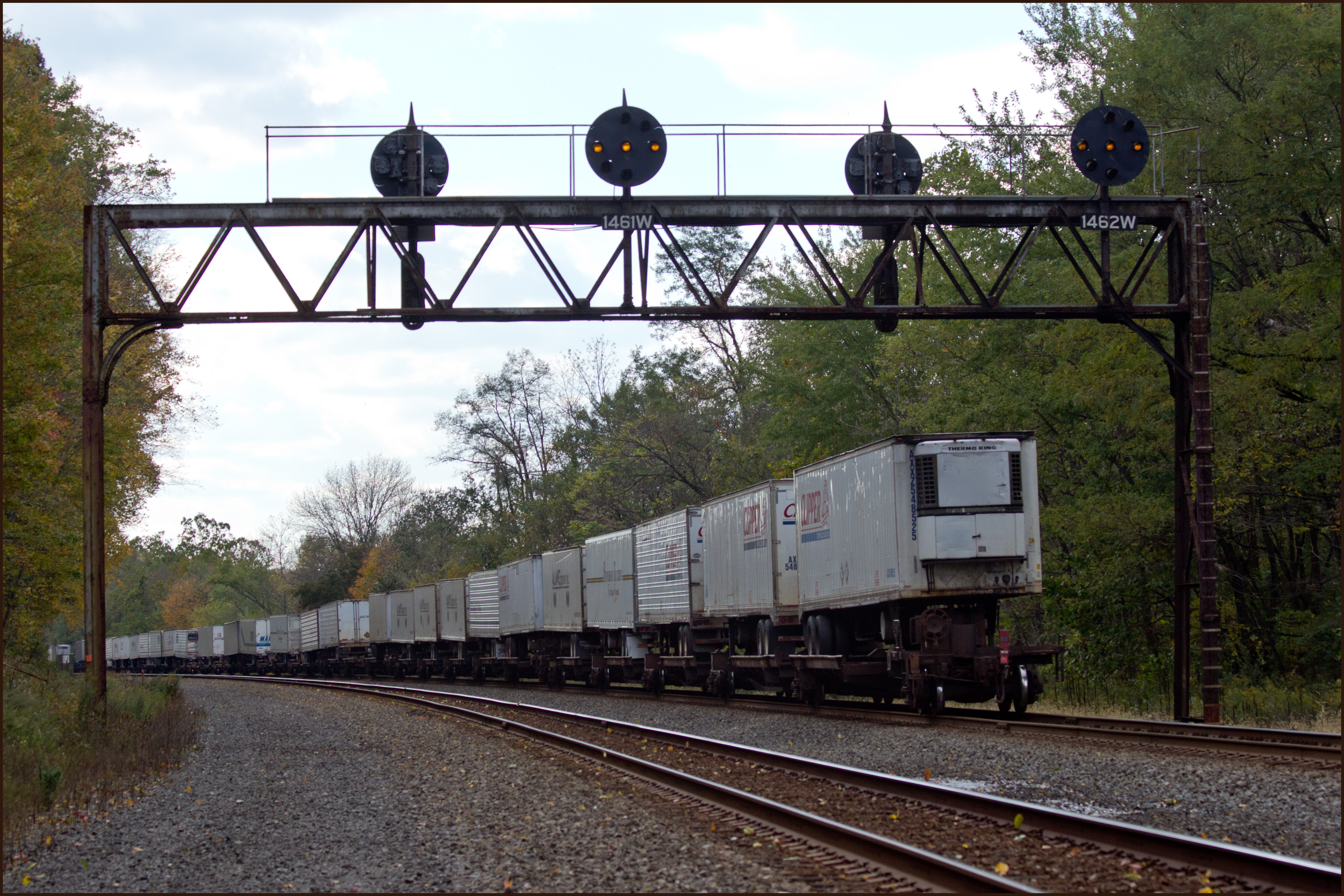
Trailers on flatcars in the United States

== See also ==
- Autorack
- Bière–Apples–Morges Railway
- Car carrier trailer
- Car float
- Double-stack rail transport
- Ferry
- Fireman's carry
- Hupac
- Konkan Railway Corporation
- Loading gauge
- Modalohr
- Motorail
- Pichi Richi Railway
- Roadrailer
- Rolling highway
- Roll-on/roll-off
- Structure gauge
- Train ferry
- Two-foot-gauge railways in South Africa
