= CFL Class 3000 =

Class of electrical locomotives

CFL 3000 Tractis
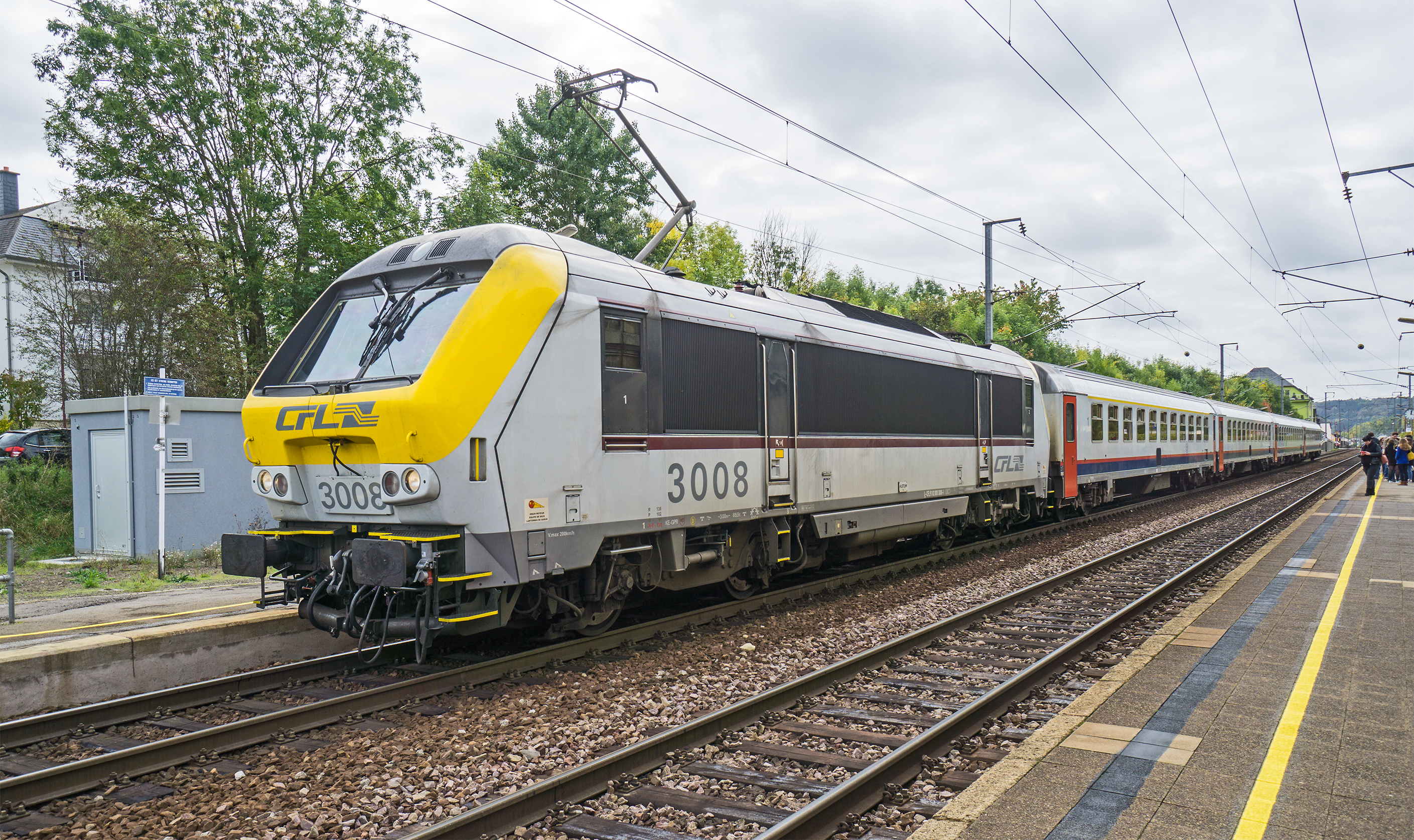
- CFL class 3000 in 2015
Type and origin
- Power type: Electric
- Builder: Alstom (Charleroi/Belfort); Bombardier Transportation (BN, Bruges)
- Build date: 1997–1998
- Total produced: 20
Specifications
- Configuration
  - UIC: Bo′Bo′
- Gauge: 1,435 mm (4 ft 8 1/2 in)
- Driver dia.: 1,160 to 1,090 mm (46 to 43 in) (new/worn)
- Wheelbase: 3.000 m (9 ft 10.1 in) (bogie); 10.400 m (34 ft 1.4 in) (between bogie centres)
- Length: 19.11 m (62 ft 8 in)
- Width: 3.026 m (9 ft 11 in)
- Height: 4.275 m (14 ft 0 in)
- Loco weight: 90 t
- Electric system/s: 25 kV AC, 3 kV DC, 1.5 kV DC
- Current pickup: Pantograph
- Loco brake: Electro-pneumatic / rheostatic / electro-regenerative
- Safety systems: KVB (SNCF), TBL2 (SNCB)
Performance figures
- Maximum speed: 200 km/h (124 mph)
- Power output: 5,200 kW (7,000 hp) under 25 kV AC or 3 kV DC; 2,100 kW (2,800 hp) under 1.5 kV DC
- Tractive effort: 288 kN (65,000 lbf) (starting)
Career
- Operators: CFL
- Numbers: 3002-3020, 3001 is stored
- Sources: except where noted

The CFL class 3000 is a class of twenty mixed use 200 km/h Tractis type electric locomotives ordered by the Chemins de Fer Luxembourgeois (CFL) in 1995 as part of a joint order with SNCB of 80 units from Alstom.

== Background, design and operation ==
The CFL 3000 class have the same mechanical and electrical design as the SNCB 13 locomotives. They were ordered in 1995 to replace electric and diesel locomotives dating from the 1950/60s.

The class were constructed between 1998 and 1999, and entered service from 1998 to 2001. On introduction the class experienced a number of problems relating to electrical/electromagnetic interference with track circuits, signalling systems, and issues with noise introduction onto power supplies.

The locomotives share the work on Brussels - Luxembourg services, and exclusively work the Liège - Luxembourg trains. They are also used on freight services between Luxembourg and France/Belgium.
