= Hoist =

Hoist may refer to:

- Hoist (device), a machine for lifting loads
- Hoist controller, a machine for raising and lowering goods or personnel by means of a cable
- Hydraulic hooklift hoist, another machine
- Hoist (mining), another machine
- Hoist (flag), the half of a flag nearer to the flagpole
- Hoist (album), by Phish
- USS Hoist (ARS-40), a Bolster class rescue and salvage ship acquired by the U.S. Navy during World War II
- Hoist (motion), a parliamentary procedure used in Canadian legislative bodies
- Patient lift, for lifting people
- Outliner, filter for viewing

== Computing ==
In computing, hoisting may refer to:

- Loop-invariant code motion, a compiler optimization
- Variable hoisting, scope rule in JavaScript
