= Jack de la Vergne =

Jack de la Vergne is a Canadian civil engineer who specializes in underground mining and recipient of the Professional Engineers Ontario Engineering Medal in 2005.

De la Vergne is the author of the Hard Rock Miner's Handbook and the Hard Rock Miners Technical Spanish Dictionary and is recognized as an industry expert in mine shafts and mine hoists.
