= Witczak Winding Tower =

Coordinates: 50°21′19″N 18°56′00″E

- Szyb „Witczak”
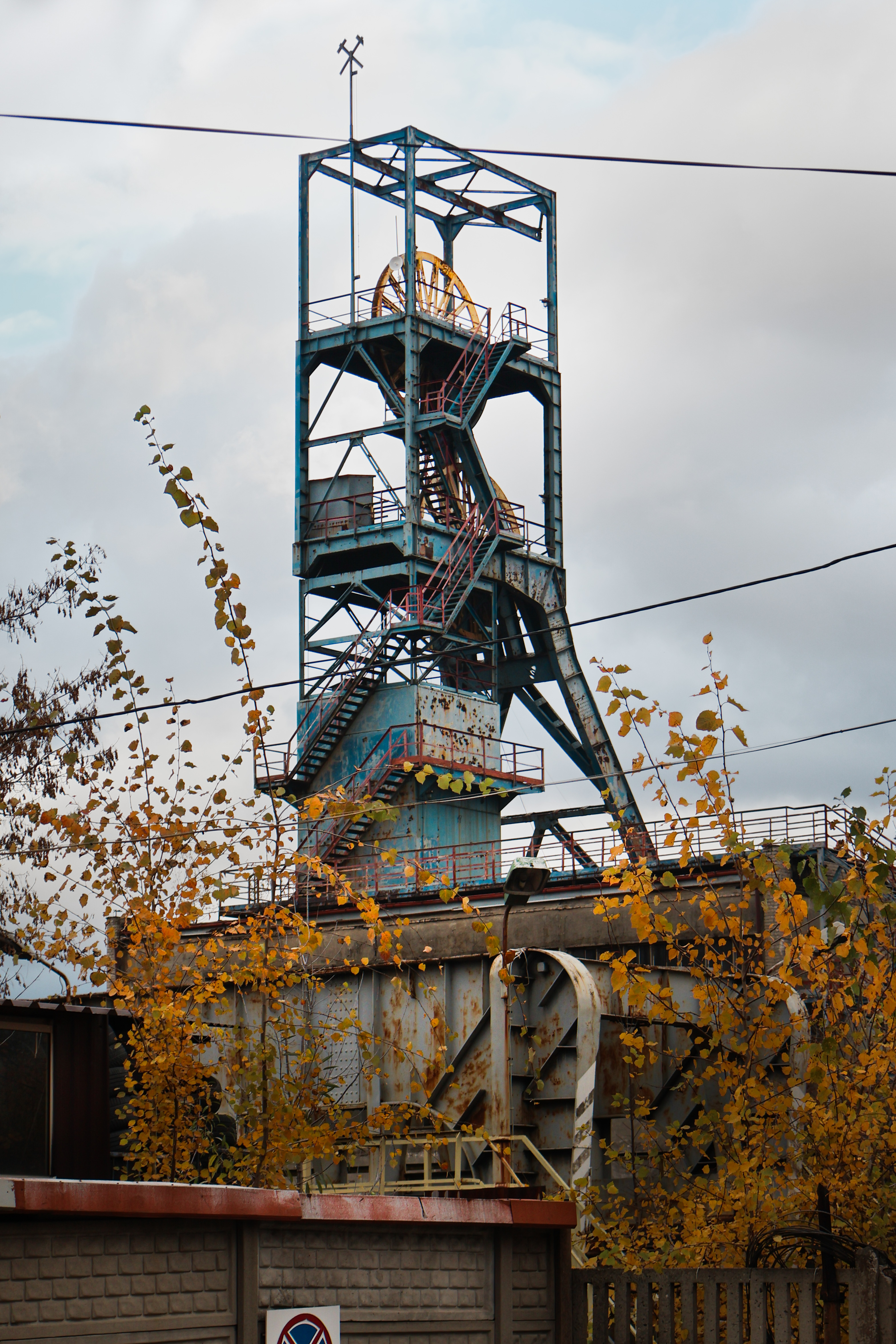
- Witczak Winding Tower, October 2025

General information
- Location: ul. Stanisława Witczaka 128, Bytom, Poland
- Completed: 1965
- Closed: 2015 (Note: liquidation of the Centrum Coal Mine in Bytom.); 2022 (Note: Shaft backfilled.)
- Owner: Municipality of Bytom
- Height: 35 m (115 ft)

The Witczak Winding Tower (Polish: Szyb „Witczak”) is a peripheral winding tower of the liquidated Centrum Coal Mine in Bytom, Poland. The winding tower stands at 35 meters tall, and is located in the Rozbark district of the city—some 3 km from the main structure of the former Centrum Coal Mine.

Although the winding tower is not a registered landmark on the Polish national Registry of Cultural Property (Polish: Rejestr zabytków), protection over it was established by the Bytom City Council in 2009.

== History ==
The Witczak shaft was sunk between 1961 and 1965, reaching 774.1 metres (2,540 ft). The shaft featured a 31.4-metre-deep (103 ft) sump, thus reaching a maximum depth of 805.5 metres (2,643 ft). The 35-metre-tall (115 ft) winding tower was erected in 1965. The peripheral shaft belonged to the Dymitrow Coal Mine in Bytom (Renamed "Centrum Coal Mine" in 1990).

Witczak served as an exhaust and backfill shaft and allowed for the transport of material and excavation. The shaft featured a two-compartment mine cage. Two small carts could fit into each compartment of the mine cage. The crew could only descent using the lower compartment. Due to the distance between Witczak and the main structure of the Centrum Coal Mine, workers were transported to the shaft by bus for some time. In addition to the winding tower, the area around Witczak features a hoisting machine building, the main ventilation fans, a backfill water tank, bathhouse building, boiler room, backfill bridge, as well as workshop and utility rooms.

From 1993 Witczak belonged to the Centrum-Szombierki Coal Mine; from 2005 to the Bobrek-Centrum Coal Mine. With the liquidation of the Centrum Coal Mine in 2015 the site of the former mine, including the Witczak shaft, came under the management of the state-run Mine Restructuring Company (Polish: Spółka Restrukturyzacji Kopalń; SRK).

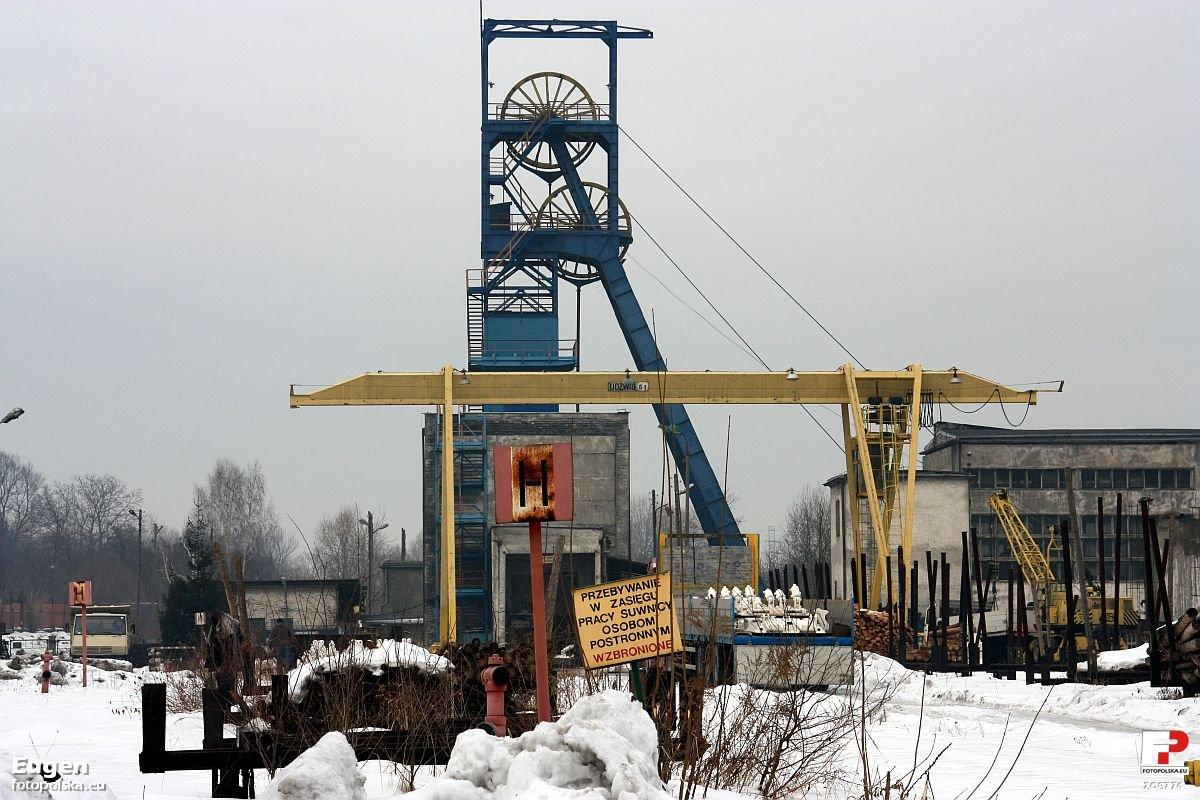
Witczak Winding Tower in 2011.

In 2019 railway tracks by the storage yard were dismantled; the demolition of Witczak was set for 2021, however, the city council of Bytom became interested in acquiring the area. Ultimately, a decision fell to solely acquire the winding tower and its adjacent buildings. In June 2021 the demolition of infrastructure by Witczak was commenced. The backfilling of the shaft was completed in September 2022 and liquidation was completed by October that same year. The transfer of the land was scheduled for 2023, with Mariusz Tomalik a spokesperson of the SRK stating that a draft agreement had been sent to the city council for approval. Concurrently, the city council of Bytom requested to conduct an inspection at the site scheduled for 12 April 2023. Ultimately, the City Council of Bytom was not able to finalise a handover deal with the SRK in 2023 and negotiations dragged on, with Mariusz Tomalik once again reassuring about the transfer of Witczak in 2024.

== Development plans ==
The city council of Bytom will not officially provide information regarding the redevelopment of the area surrounding Witczak until discussions with the SRK regarding the handover have been finalised. However, preliminary plans provide insight into its potential future use, namely a spatial development plan of Rozbark adopted under resolution no. LVII/756/22 from 28 March 2022 marks Witczak and its immediate area as a 1PU zone, i.e. an area designated for production and service-related development. The plan permits for the redevelopment of the area for innovative technology, production, science and research.
