= Hoist controller =

A hoist controller is the controller for a hoist. The term is used primarily in the context of electrically operated hoists, but it is apparent that the control systems of many 20th century steam hoists also incorporated controllers of significant complexity. Consider the control system of the Quincy Mine No. 2 Hoist. This control system included interlocks to close the throttle valve at the end of trip and to prevent opening the throttle again until the winding engine was reversed. The control system also incorporated a governor to control the speed of the hoist and indicator wheels to show the hoist operator the positions of the skips in the mine shaft.

The hoist controllers for modern electric mining hoists have long included such features as automatic starting of the hoist when the weight of coal or ore in the skip reaches a set point, automatic acceleration of the hoist to full speed and automatic deceleration at the end of travel. Hoist controllers need both velocity and absolute position references taken, typically taken from the winding drum of the hoist. Modern hoist controllers replace many of the mechanical analog mechanisms of earlier controllers with digital control systems.

== See also ==
- Hydraulic hooklift hoist
