= Harrington Machine Shop =

- U.S. National Register of Historic Places
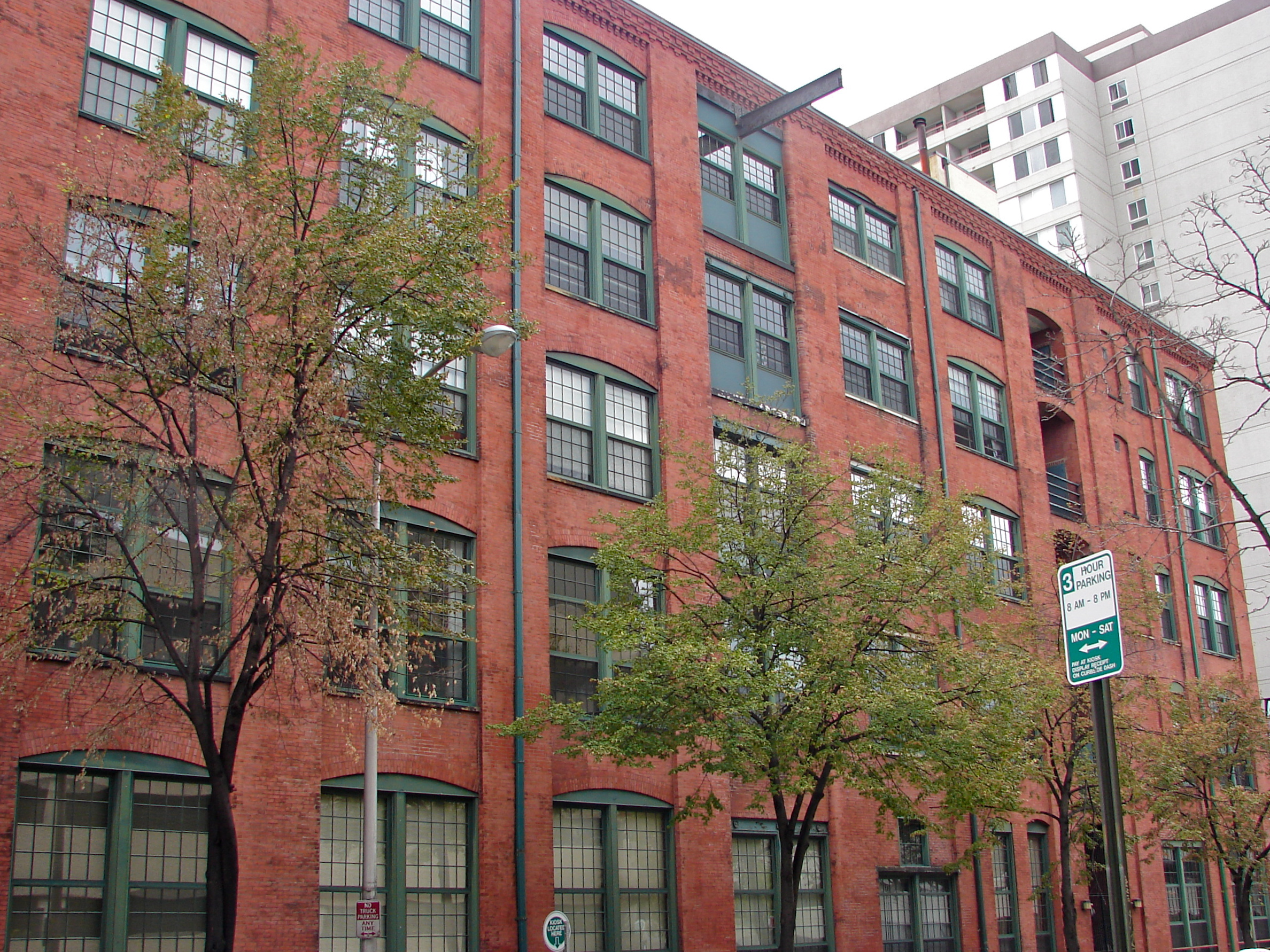
- Harrington Machine Shop, September 2010

- Location within Philadelphia Location within Pennsylvania Location within the United States
- Location: 1640-1666 Callowhill St., Philadelphia, Pennsylvania
- Coordinates: 39°57′38″N 75°10′1″W
- Area: 0.1 acres (0.040 ha)
- Built: 1903
- Architect: Roydhouse, Arey & Co.
- NRHP reference No.: 83002270
- Added to NRHP: May 6, 1983

The Harrington Machine Shop is an historic industrial building in the Franklintown area of Philadelphia in Pennsylvania, United States.

It was added to the National Register of Historic Places in 1983.

== History and architectural features ==
This historic, former machine shop is located next to the former Middishade Clothing Factory. Built in 1903, it is a five-story building with a steel and wood frame, faced with brick and ashlar stone. It measures 215 feet by 100 feet. The company made hoists.

The Harrington Machine Shop was added to the National Register of Historic Places in 1983. The interior has been converted into loft apartments.
