= Barony A Frame =

Preserved headframe, built 1954, at an inactive Scottish colliery

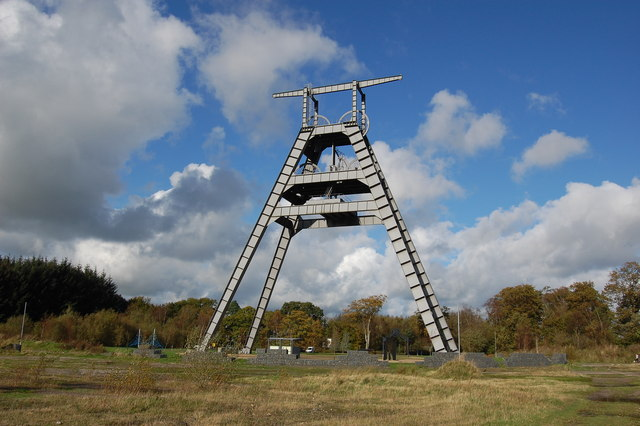
- The Barony A Frame
- Interactive map of the Barony A Frame area

General information
- Location: Near Auchinleck, East Ayrshire, Scotland
- Coordinates: 55.4683°N 4.3323°W
- Owner: Barony A Frame Trust

The Barony A Frame is a preserved headgear in East Ayrshire, Scotland, located 2 kilometres (1.2 mi) west of Auchinleck. One hundred and eighty feet high, it was built in 1954 as part of the modernisation of the Barony Colliery, which had been opened in 1907.

The colliery closed in 1989, and in 1990 the winding engine houses, generating station and water-treatment works, as well as the A frame, were given listed building status, as category B listed structures.

It is the last remaining example of its type in Britain, and was restored in 2007 by the Barony A Frame Trust. Over £1 million was spent refurbishing the structure, including funding from Historic Scotland and the Heritage Lottery Fund. The A-frame was reopened by Prince Charles, the Duke of Rothesay in January 2008.
