= Middishade Clothing Factory =

- U.S. National Register of Historic Places
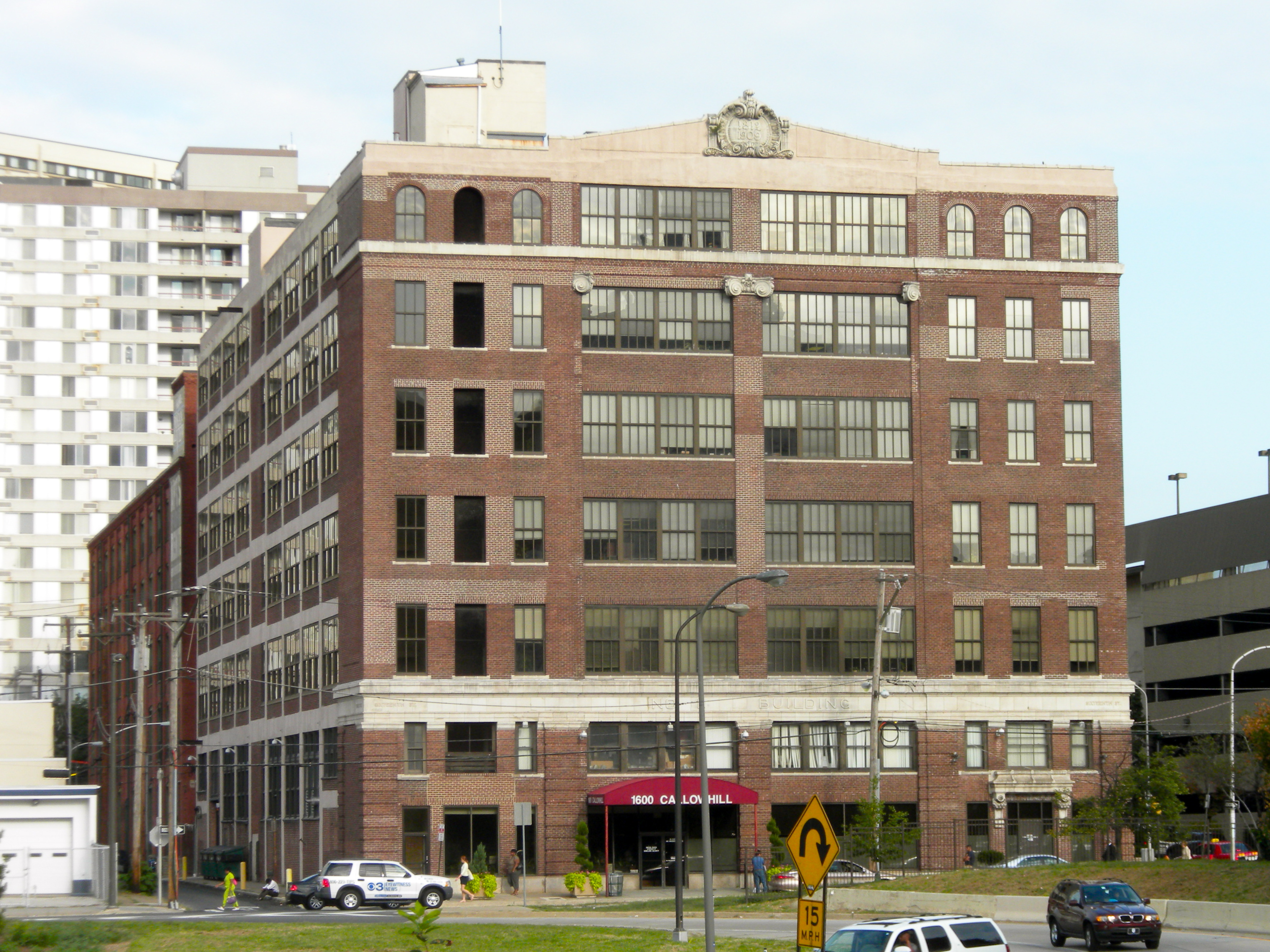
- Middishade Clothing Factory, August 2010

- Location within Philadelphia Location within Pennsylvania Location within the United States
- Location: 1600 Callowhill St., Philadelphia, Pennsylvania
- Coordinates: 39°57′36″N 75°9′56″W
- Area: 0.5 acres (0.20 ha)
- Built: 1908
- Architect: Watson & Huckel
- NRHP reference No.: 86003579
- Added to NRHP: January 6, 1987

The Middishade Clothing Factory, also known as the C.C. Knight Factory, is an historic factory in the Franklintown section of Philadelphia, Pennsylvania, United States, next to the former Harrington Machine Shop.

It was added to the National Register of Historic Places in 1986.

== History and architectural features ==
Built in 1908, this historic structure is a six-story, reinforced, concrete building that was faced in brick and terra cotta. It housed the Middishade Clothing Company until 1986.

The building was subsequently converted to office usage and now houses the regional office of the U.S. Citizenship and Immigration Services. It was added to the National Register of Historic Places in 1986.
