= Hard Rock Miner's Handbook =

- Author: Jack de la Vergne
- Language: English
- Genre: Reference
- Publisher: McIntosh Engineering
- Publication date: First edition, 2000
- Publication place: United States
- Media type: Hardcover; CD-ROM; Download
- Pages: 314
- ISBN: 0-9687006-1-6
- OCLC: 53252849

The Hard Rock Miner's Handbook is a reference book that deals with the underground hard-rock mining industry. It was written by engineer Jack de la Vergne as a non-profit publication. The first edition was published in 2000 by McIntosh Engineering, a mining engineering consulting company. It is currently in its third printing, is used by thousands of people in the mining industry, including students, professors, miners, engineers and mining executives as a source of practical mining information, as well as "Rules of Thumb" and "Tricks of the trade" are used widely in the mining industry. Copies of the handbook have been distributed to more than 113 countries around the world.
