= Hydraulic hooklift hoist =

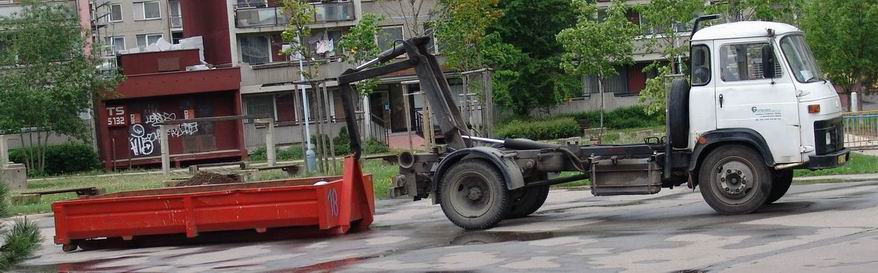
Typical hooklift hoist (single lift/dump cylinder configuration)

Hydraulic hooklift hoists are mounted on heavy duty trucks to enable hauliers to change out flatbeds, dumpster bodies, and similar containers. Primarily used in conjunction with tilt frame bodies and specialised roller containers, generally designed for the transportation of materials in the waste, recycling, scrap and demolition industries, as well as for disposal of construction debris.

The system employs a series of hydraulic rams to hook, lift and hoist the container onto the chassis of the truck. There are several configuration options, and strict guidelines which must be followed to ensure that the container is secured on the truck in transit.

== Load capacity ==
Lift and dump capacities of hydraulic hooklift hoists typically range from 8,000 to 68,000 lb (3,630 to 30,800 kg). Generally a hoist is capable of lifting (off the ground) and dumping (onto the ground) the same maximum capacity, although there can be exceptions where short wheel bases are involved.

The ratio of container length to chassis length is a factor in achieving rated load capacity. This ratio determines the load angle, and all hooklift hoist systems indicate a recommended range of body lengths, typically 3–5 ft (914–1,524 mm) difference in length between the container and the chassis. Container bodies shorter than the recommended length produce substantially steeper load angles, and consequently lower load rating, than those of the longest bodies intended for use with a particular hoist.

Chassis frame height is also important, as the lower the chassis frame height, the lower the potential load angle. A combination of low chassis with the longest recommended body lengths offers the best case.

Finally, hook height has an effect, as a taller hook height achieves a greater lift and dump capacity.

== System components ==
=== Hydraulic system ===
The hydraulic operating pressure of all hooklift hoists are preset at the factory to achieve the intended lifting capacity for the design application. The original approach used by early European models, still widely used today, was a high pressure / low volume system. This setup suits chassis with space restraints, allowing for use of a smaller piston pump and a smaller hydraulic reservoir. Such systems operate between 4,000 to 5,800 psi (28,000 to 40,000 kPa).

The North American market developed low pressure / high volume systems, which allowed operators to share the hoist's hydraulic system with other hydraulically powered devices. These systems typically operate with a larger gear pump and larger hydraulic reservoir. Operating pressures range from 2,000 to 3,500 psi (14,000 to 24,000 kPa).

=== Jib system ===
There are two common types of jib system, each controlled by a single hydraulic cylinder. Both systems can be used with either a single or dual rear pivot section.

- The articulating jib, also referred to as a tilting jib, is a simple a-frame. When extending the cylinder, the container/body is pushed up and back, exiting the rear locks. When retracting the cylinder, the container/body is pulled forward and down, engaging the rear locks.
- The sliding jib consists of a single arm, composed of a tube inside a tube. When extending the cylinder, this design pulls the container/body forward, engaging the rear locks. When retracting the cylinder, this design pushes the container/body rearward, exiting the rear locks.

=== Rear pivot section ===
- The single rear pivot system is the simpler of the two rear pivot designs. Every function operates relative to a pivot point, typically located in front of the rear axle. This design does not allow traditional tip-dumping capabilities.
- The dual rear pivot system is more complex, offering the added benefit of a traditional tip-dumping capability. This is achieved by pivoting at the rear of the hoist, typically behind the rear axle.

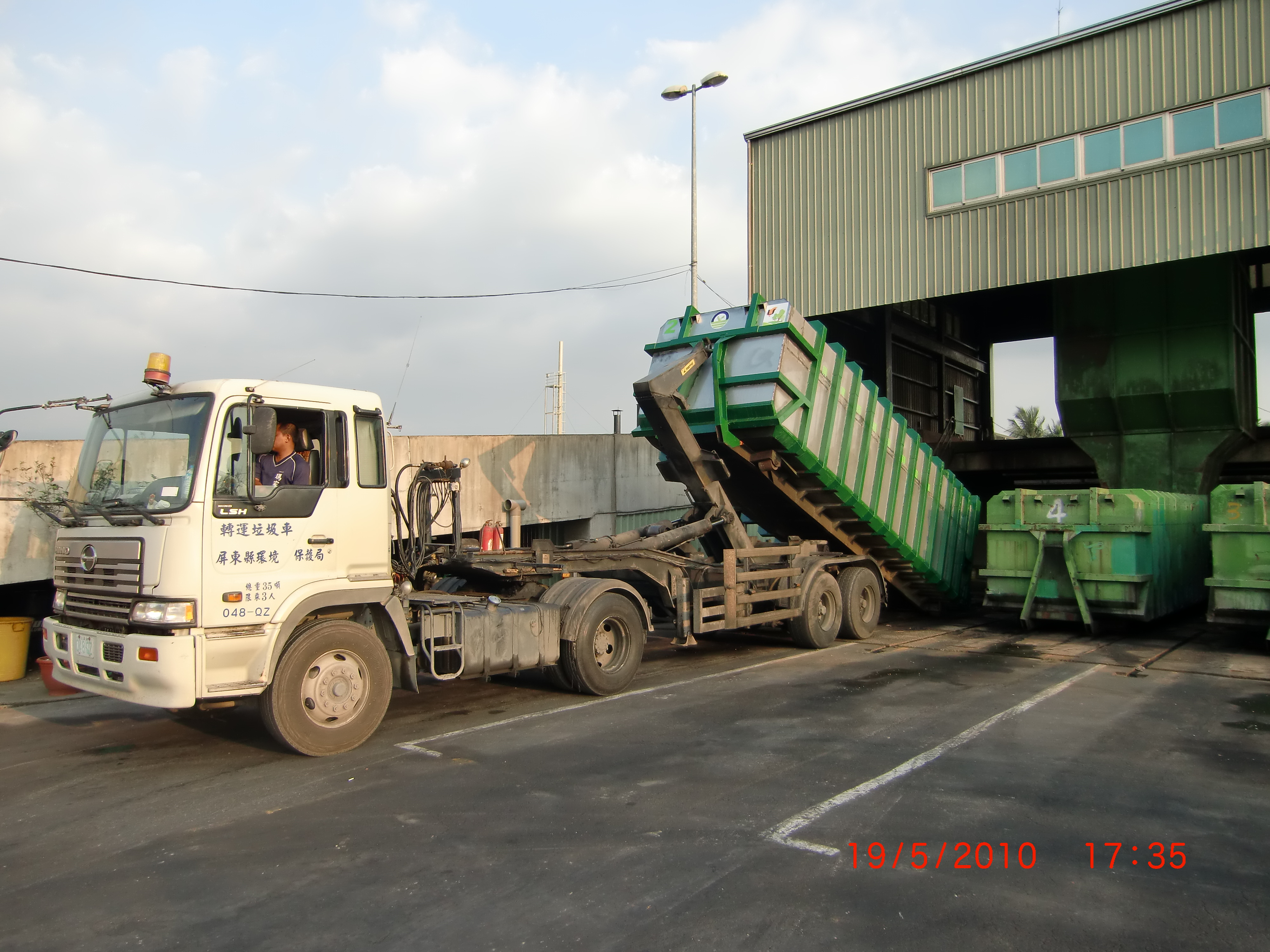
25-ton hooklift hoist (dual lift/dump cylinder) mid lift

=== Rear lock system ===
There are typically two styles of rear lock. Both styles can be located on the hoist such that they are positioned either on the inside or outside of the container/body long rails.

- The prong style rear lock offers a container/body engagement of up to 7 in (178 mm). This design allows restricted weight transfer while the container/body remains inside the rear locks.
- The slide through style rear lock offers a container/body engagement of up to 50 in (1,270 mm). This style typically allows more extensive weight transfer while the container/body remains inside the rear locks.

=== Lift/dump cylinder(s) ===
Two configurations are typical, both suitable for either single or dual pivot designs.

- The single lift/dump cylinder design reduces unit cost, retains true hooklift capabilities, but can be unstable while dumping on uneven ground.
- The dual lift/dump cylinder design, whilst increasing unit cost, improves load handling stability when dumping on uneven ground.

=== Safety features ===
A series of safety valves act to ensure safe operation of the system.

- Counterbalance valves, also called load holding valves or over-center valves, serve as hydraulic resistance to the actuating cylinder when the load weight is required to be held in position for a period of time. These come in two distinct configurations, both highly effective in improving load handling safety during a loss of hydraulic pressure: essentially locking the lift/dump cylinder in-place, preventing potential free fall of the load in the event of hydraulic failure.
  - Remote mounted system, in which the counterbalance valve is mounted outside the cylinder. This is the more cost effective solution, but can be prone to damage.
  - Integral system, in which the counterbalance valve is built directly into the main cylinder, eliminating the potential for damage by falling debris.
- Jib safety valves are not a feature of all systems, but are designed to render the jib cylinder inoperable during the dump cycle. This protects the system from damage should the operator accidentally pull the wrong control lever during the dump cycle.
- The hook latch covers the opening in the hook head, effectively securing the lift bar inside the hook head during transport and dump. It is designed to augment the rear lock system during transit
- Some systems utilize proximity switches to indicate to the operator which part of the lift/dump cycle is current, or whether there is a fault in the system. These can me mounted in a variety of locations throughout the hoist. When activated, a red warning light and/or alarm sounds in the cab.
- Below grade reach is the distance that the hook head travels below the lifting bar on the container. This distance varies between hoist systems, ranging from 1 to 24 in or 25 to 610 mm. A below grade reach of 5 in (127 mm), or greater, improves stability when working on uneven ground.

=== Cab controls ===
Cab controls can either be operated by cable, air or electricity. Both cable and air controls, in a floor mounted lever configuration, offer additional benefits in controlling the load, by feathering the controls.

- Cable controls are the least expensive, and are commonly floor mounted levers. They are generally favored in cold weather environments.
- Air controls can be installed as floor mounted levers or dashboard mounted switches.
- Electric controls are the most expensive and only come as dashboard mounted switches. The disadvantage of these systems, is that the control is either on or off, and thus controlling the load by feathering is not an option.

== Advantages ==
The flexibility offered by the hydraulic hooklift hoist system offers several advantages:

- Reduced licensing fees through reduced fleet size
- Ground level loading and unloading
- Exact positioning (dropping off) of containers
- Ability to get in and out of tight spaces
- Quick exchange of containers: system allows container to be lift/dropped in around 90 seconds
- Ability to engage a container up to 30° off center when picking up
- No cables to hook up, unhook or that could potentially break
- Complete in-cab operation
- Makes it possible to haul multiple containers by use of a trailer.

== Disadvantages ==
The main disadvantages of the system are revealed on uneven ground:

- If below grade reach is small, it can be difficult to set down or pick up container
- Load handling stability, particularly while dumping, can be compromised at maximum dump angle. This is particularly the case in single lift/dump cylinder configurations
- Container lengths are fairly inflexible, as hooklift hoists are designed to carry bodies within 3 to 5 ft (914 to 1,524 mm) of the shortest recommended body

== See also ==
- Hoist (device)
- Intermodal container
- Swap body
