= Hoist (device) =

Device used for lifting or lowering a load

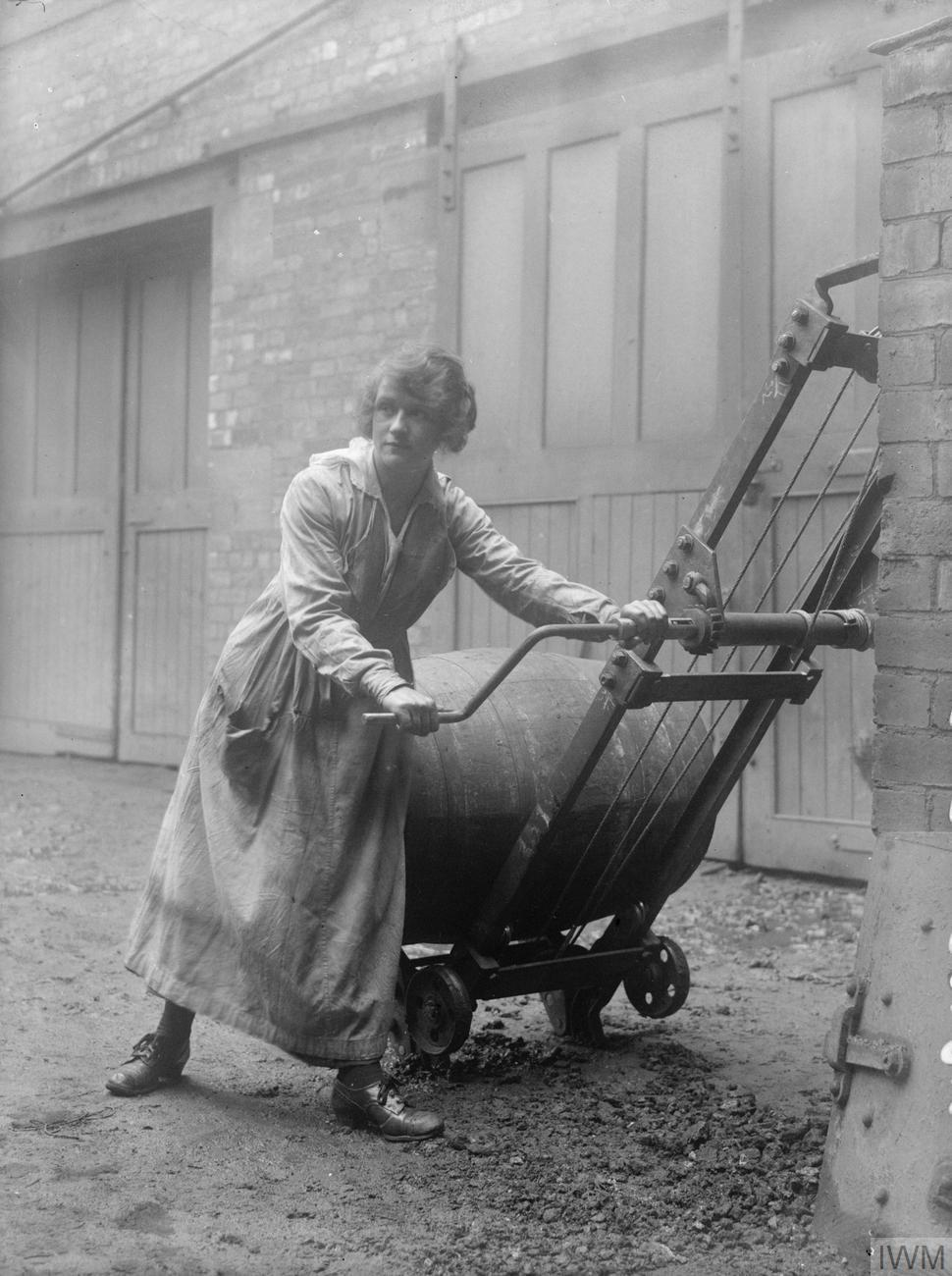
A hand-powered hoist for lifting barrels, 1918

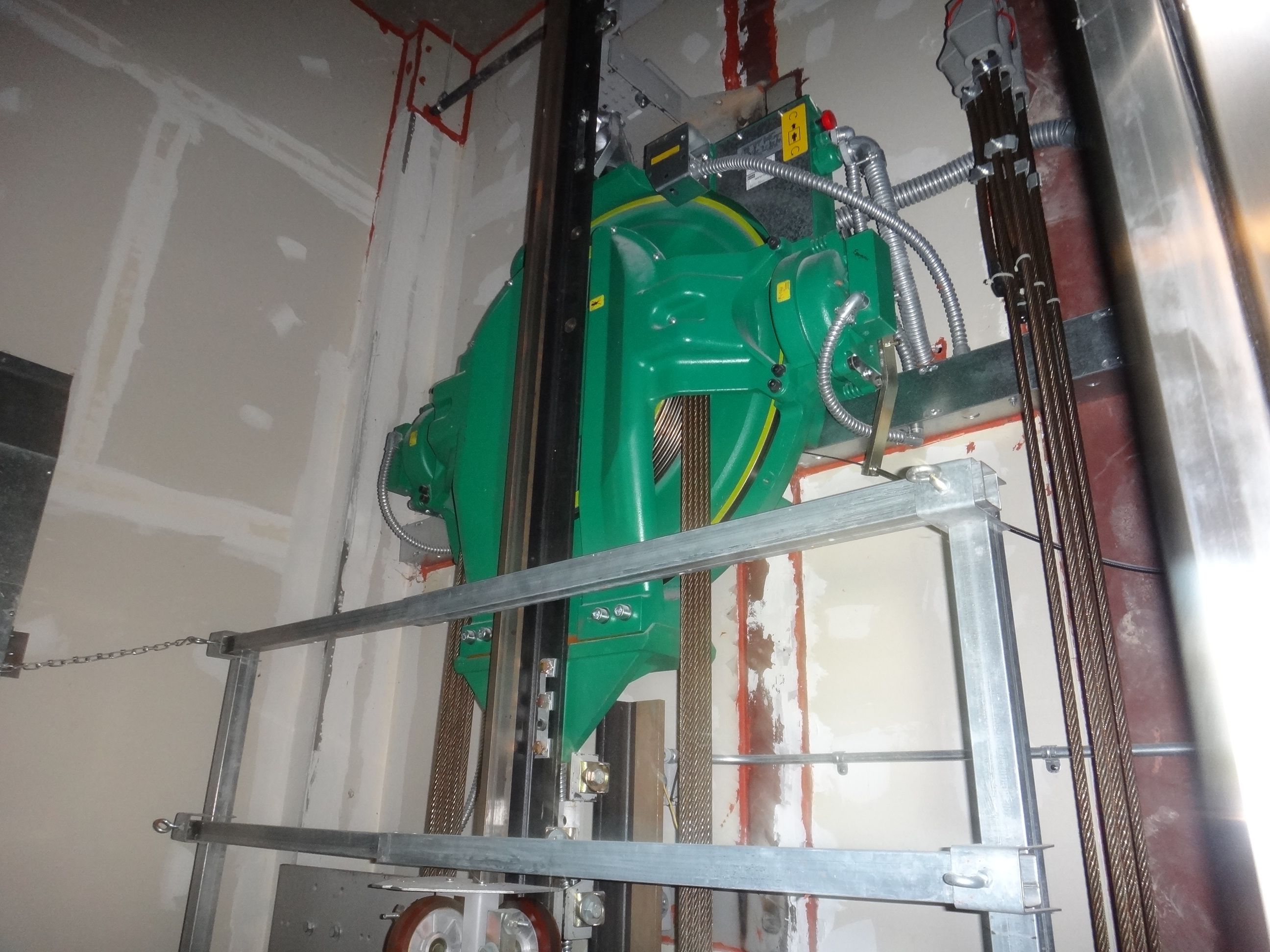
Hoist atop an elevator

A hoist is a device used for lifting or lowering a load by means of a drum or lift-wheel around which rope or chain wraps. It may be manually operated, electrically or pneumatically driven and may use chain, fiber or wire rope as its lifting medium. The most familiar form is an elevator, the car of which is raised and lowered by a hoist mechanism. Most hoists couple to their loads using a lifting hook.

== Types ==
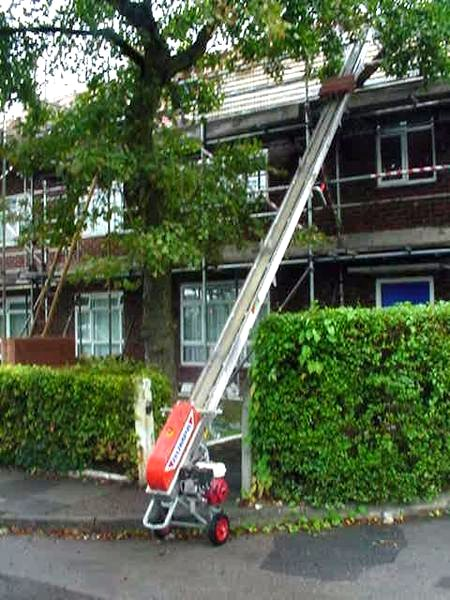
Builder's hoist, with small gasoline engine

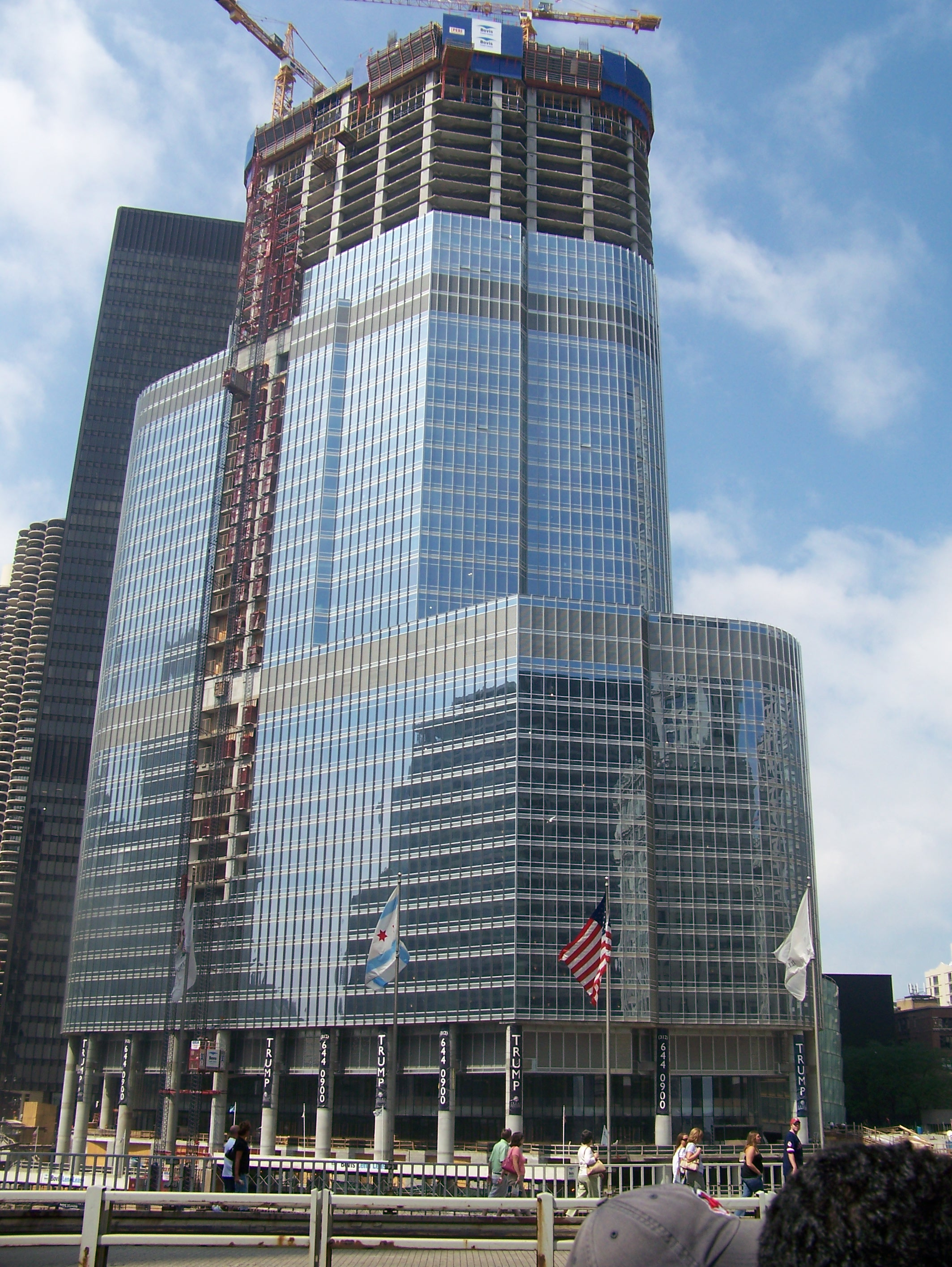
A hoist on the Trump International Hotel & Tower-Chicago

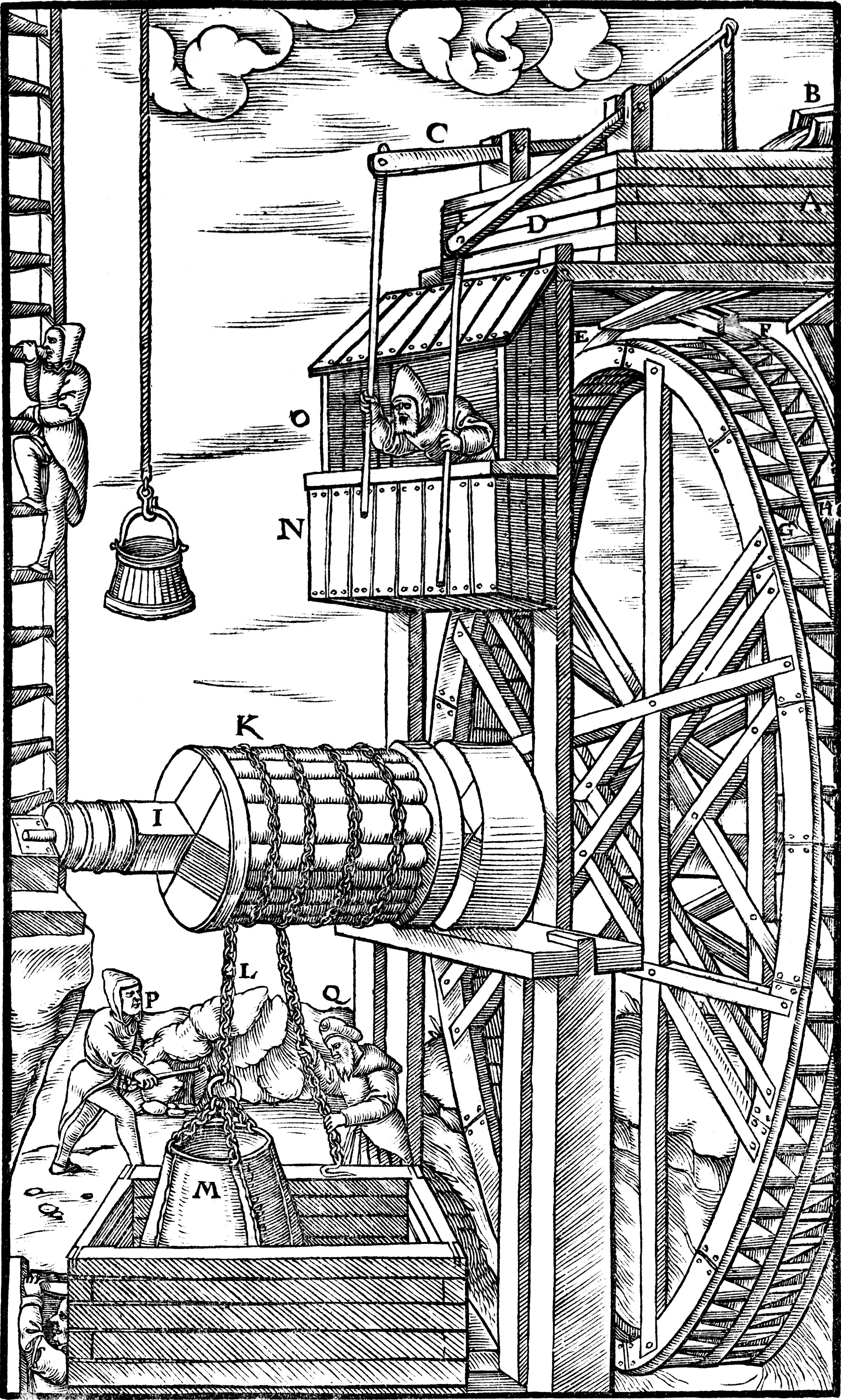
A water-powered mine hoist used for raising ore from De re metallica (1556)

The word "hoist" is used to describe many different types of equipment that lift and lower loads. For example, many people use “hoist” to describe an elevator. The information contained here pertains specially to overhead, construction and mine hoist.

=== Overhead hoist ===
Overhead hoists are defined in the American Society of Mechanical Engineers (ASME) B30 standards as a machinery unit that is used for lifting or lowering a freely suspended (unguided) load. These units are typically used in an industrial setting and may be part of an overhead crane.

A specific overhead hoist configuration is usually defined by the lifting medium, operation and suspension. The lifting medium is the type of component used to transmit and cause the vertical motion and includes wire rope, chain or synthetic strap, or rope. The operation defines the type of power used to operate the hoisting motion and includes manual power, electric power, hydraulic power or air power. The suspension defines the type of mounting method used to suspend the hoist and includes hook, clevis, lug, trolley, deck, base, wall or ceiling.

The most commonly used overhead hoist is electrical powered with wire rope or chain as the lifting medium. Both wire rope and chain hoist have been in common use since the 1800s, Cragend Farm Hydraulic Silo in Northumberland, invented by Lord Armstrong of Cragside in 1884 used chains, and was powered by water. Mass production of electric hoists did not start until the early 1900s and was first adapted by Germany. A hoist can be a serial production unit or a custom unit. Serial production hoists are typically more cost-effective and designed for a ten-year life in a light to heavy hoist duty service classification. Custom hoists are typically more expensive and are designed for a heavy to severe hoist duty service classification. Serial production hoists were once regarded as being designed for light to moderate hoist duty service classifications, but since the 60's this has changed. Over the years the custom hoist market has decreased in size with the advent of the more durable serial production hoists. A machine shop or fabricating shop will typically use a serial production hoist, while a steel mill or NASA may typically use a custom hoist to meet durability and performance requirements.

Overhead hoists require proper installation, operation, inspection, and maintenance. When selecting an overhead hoist, operators must consider the average operating time per day, load spectrum, starts per hour, operating period and equipment life. These parameters determine the Hoist Duty Service Classification, which helps hoist installers and users better understand the hoist's useful life and duty service application. The American Society of Mechanical Engineers also publishes a number or standards related to overhead hoists, including the “ASME B30.16 Standard for Overhead Hoists (Underhung)", which provides additional guidance for the proper design, installation, operation and maintenance of hoists.

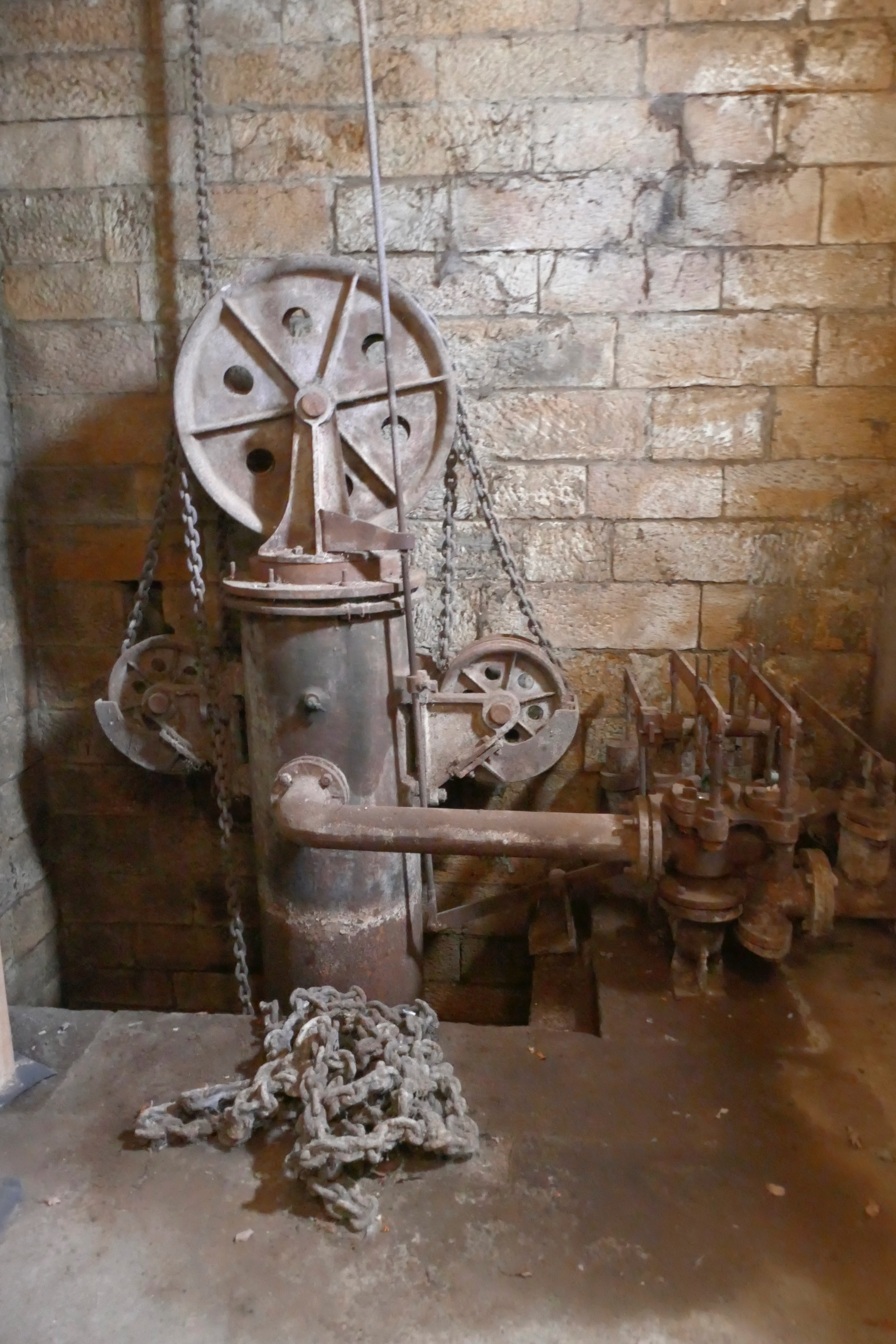
Cragend Farm Hydraulic Hoist No 1306 in Rothbury Northumberland powered by water and using chains.

=== Construction hoist ===
Also known as a Man-Lift, Buckhoist, temporary elevator, builder hoist, passenger hoist or construction elevator, a construction hoist is commonly used on large scale construction projects, such as high-rise buildings or major hospitals. There are many other uses for the construction elevator. Many other industries use the buckhoist for full-time operations, the purpose being to carry personnel, materials, and equipment quickly between the ground and higher floors, or between floors in the middle of a structure. There are three types: Utility (to move material), personnel (to move personnel), and dual-rated, which can do both.

The construction hoist is made up of either one or two cars (cages) which travel vertically along stacked mast tower sections. The mast sections are attached to the structure or building every 25 feet (7.62 m) for added stability. For precisely controlled travel along the mast sections, modern construction hoists use a motorized rack-and-pinion system that climbs the mast sections at various speeds.

While hoists have been predominantly produced in Europe and the United States, China is emerging as a manufacturer of hoists to be used in Asia.

In the United States and abroad, General Contractors and various other industrial markets rent or lease hoists for a specific projects. Rental or leasing companies provide erection, dismantling, and repair services to their hoists to provide General Contractors with turnkey services. Also, the rental and leasing companies can provide parts and service for the elevators that are under contract.

=== Mine hoist ===
A mining hoist (also known simply as a hoist or winder) is used in underground mining to raise and lower conveyances within the mine shaft. It is similar to an elevator, used for raising humans, equipment, and assorted loads.

Human, animal and water power were used to power the mine hoists documented in Agricola's De Re Metallica, published in 1556. Stationary steam engines were commonly used to power mine hoists through the 19th century and into the 20th, as at the Quincy Mine, where a 4-cylinder cross-compound Corliss engine was used. Modern hoists are powered using electric motors, historically with direct current drives utilizing solid-state converters (thyristors); however, modern large hoists use alternating current drives that are variable-frequency controlled. There are three principal types of hoists used in mining applications, Drum Hoists, Friction (or Kope) hoists and Blair multi-rope hoists. Hoist can be defined as anything that is used to lift any heavy materials.

=== Chain hoist ===
Differential pulley

== Regulations ==
Today, there are a few governing bodies for the North American overhead hoist industry which include the Hoist Manufactures Institute, ASME, and the Occupational Safety and Health Administration. HMI is a product counsel of the Material Handling Industry of America consisting of hoist manufacturers promoting safe use of their products.

In Europe, hoisting and lifting are regulated by the Machinery Directive 2006/42/EC, with an update planned starting 2027: 2023/1230.

== Gallery ==

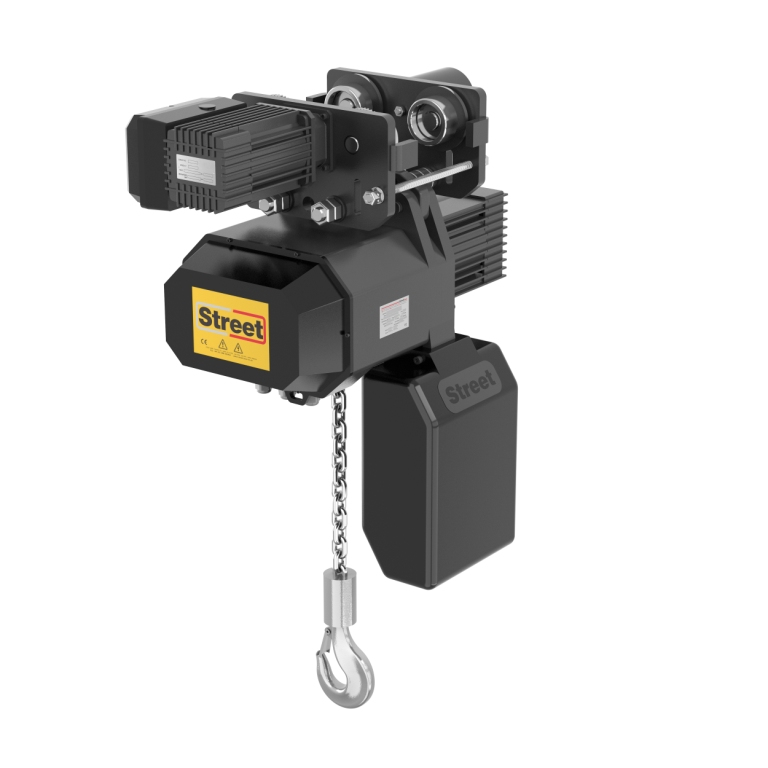

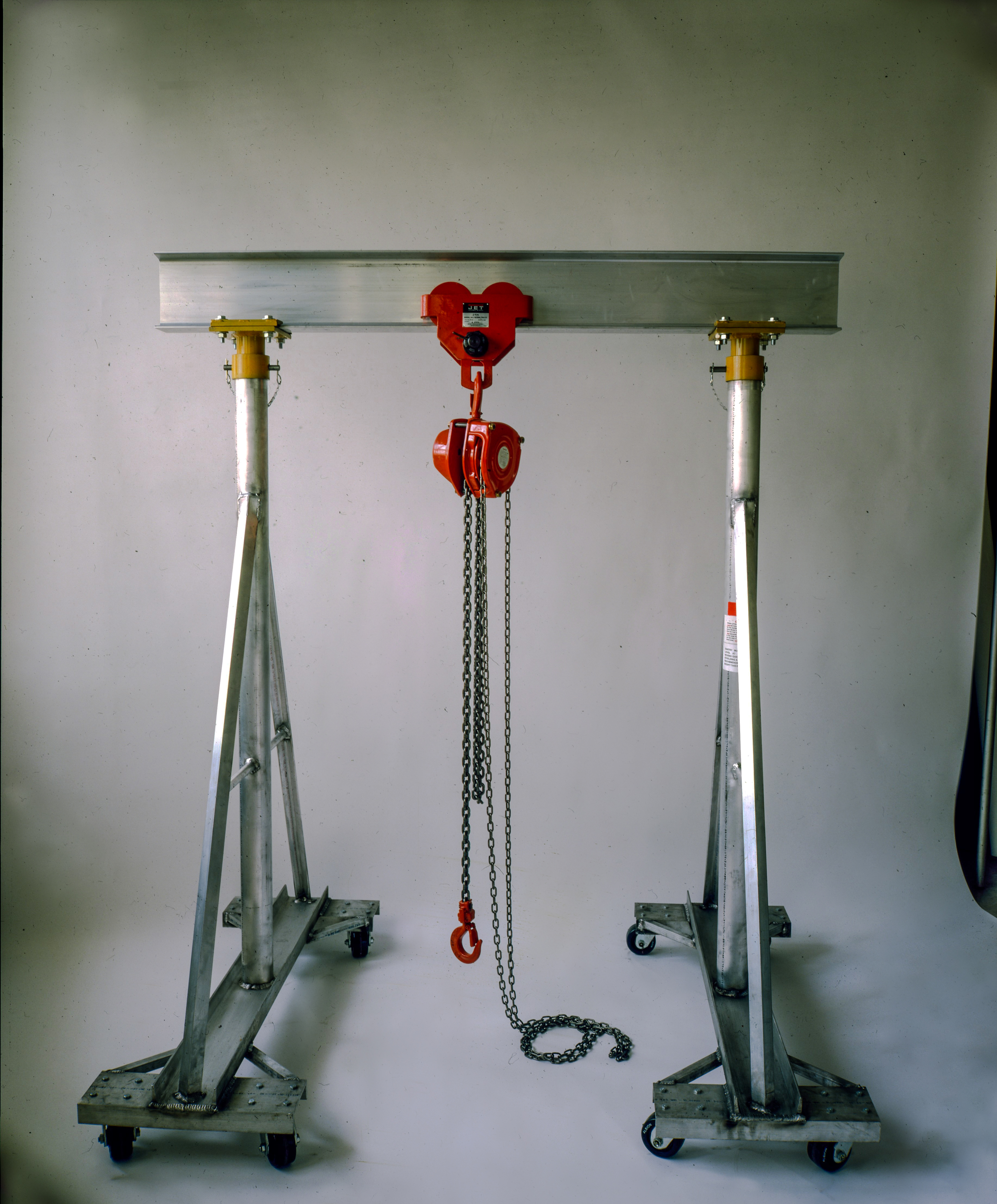

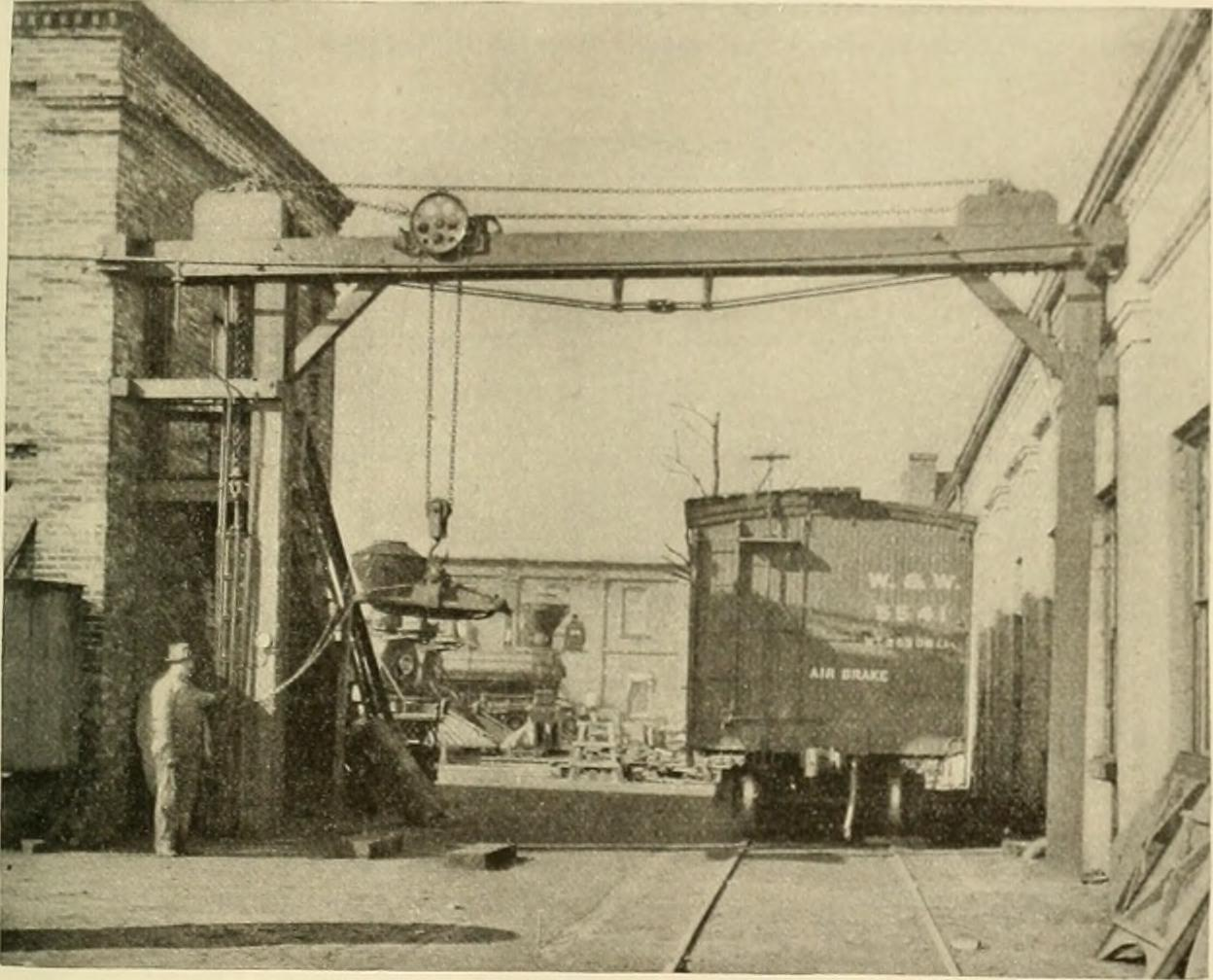

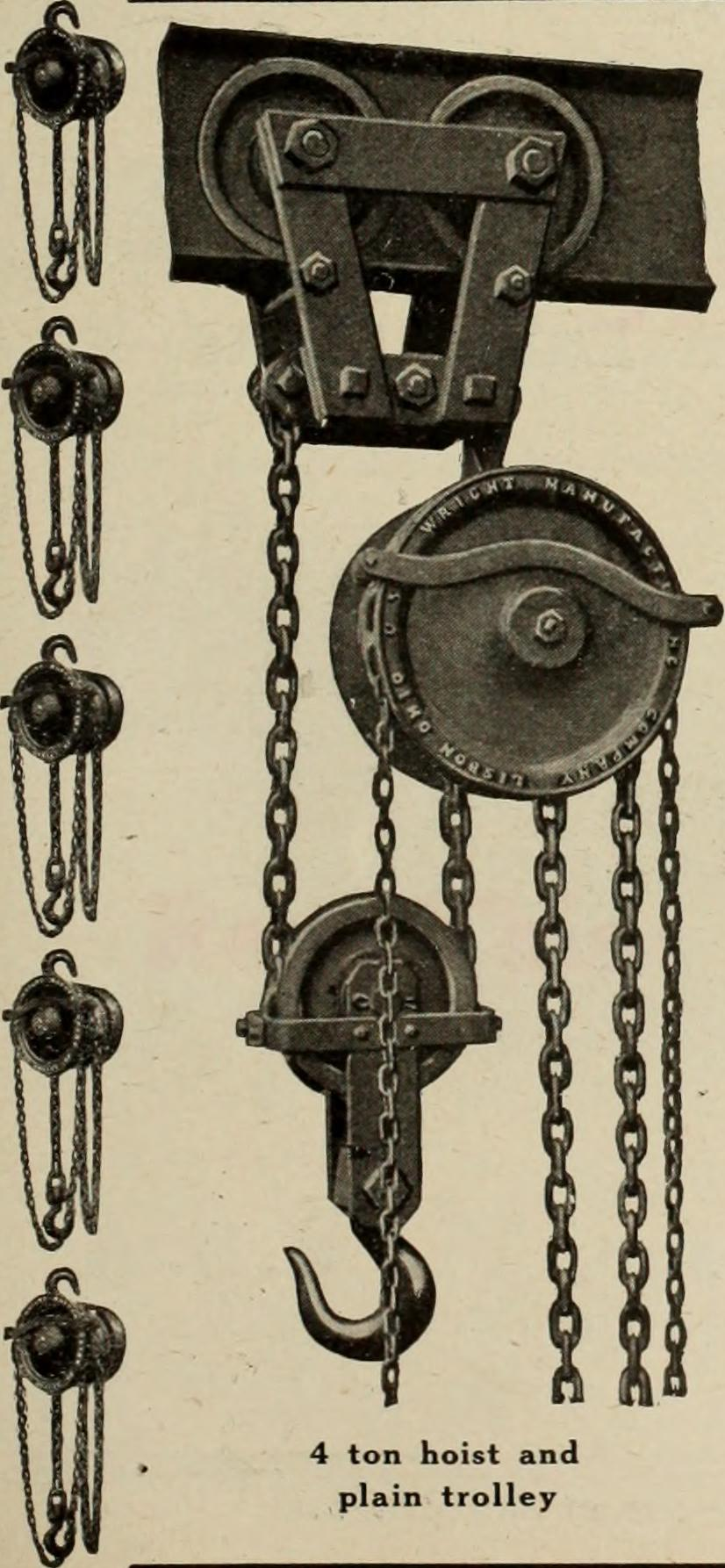

== See also ==
- Derrick
- Furniture lift
- Hoist controller
- Hoist (mining)
- Hydraulic hooklift hoist
- Hydraulic jigger
- Overhead crane
- Rigging
- Winch
- Windlass
