= Headframe =

Structural frame above an underground mine shaft

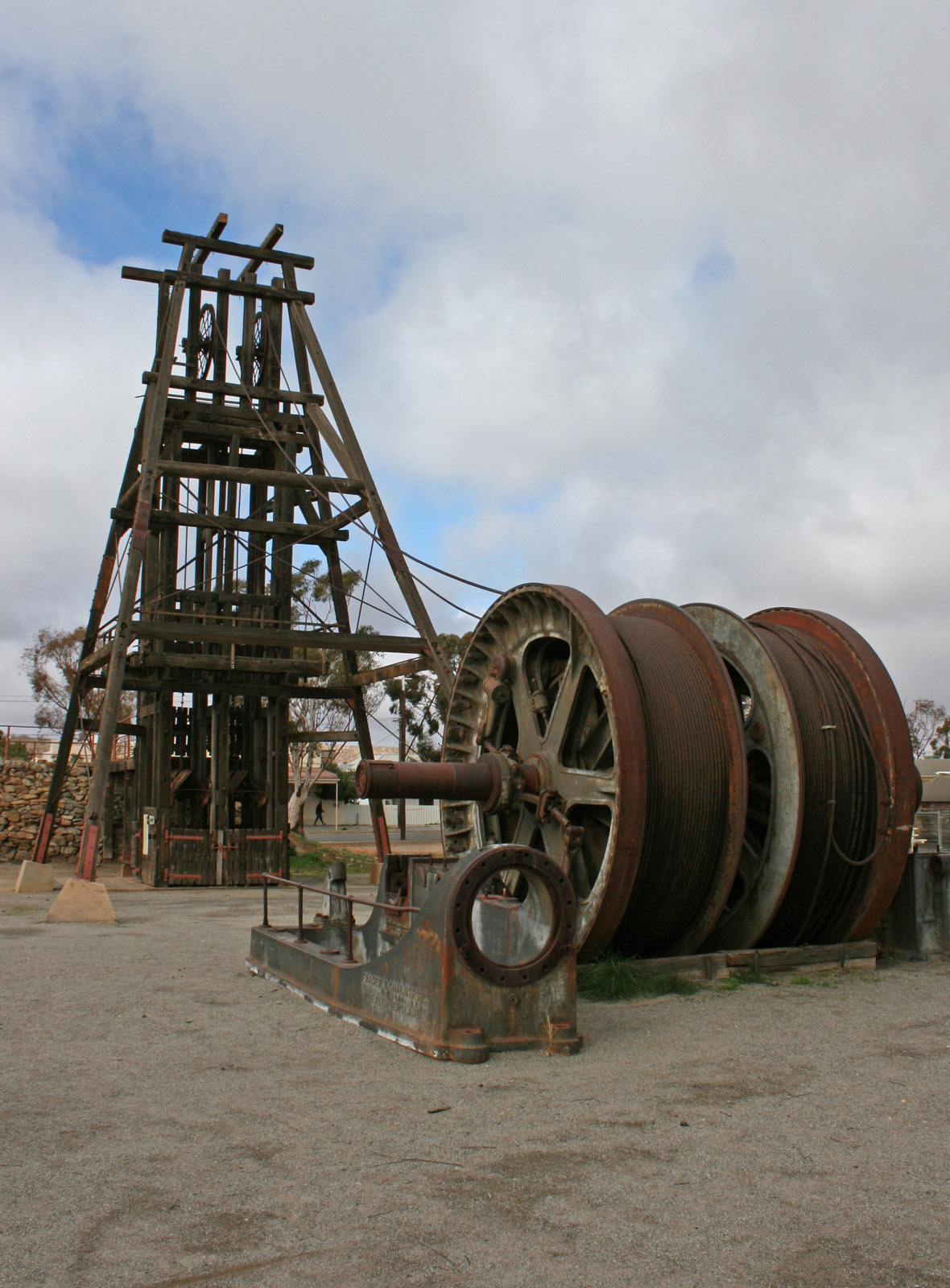
The Kintore Headframe and winding drums in Broken Hill, New South Wales

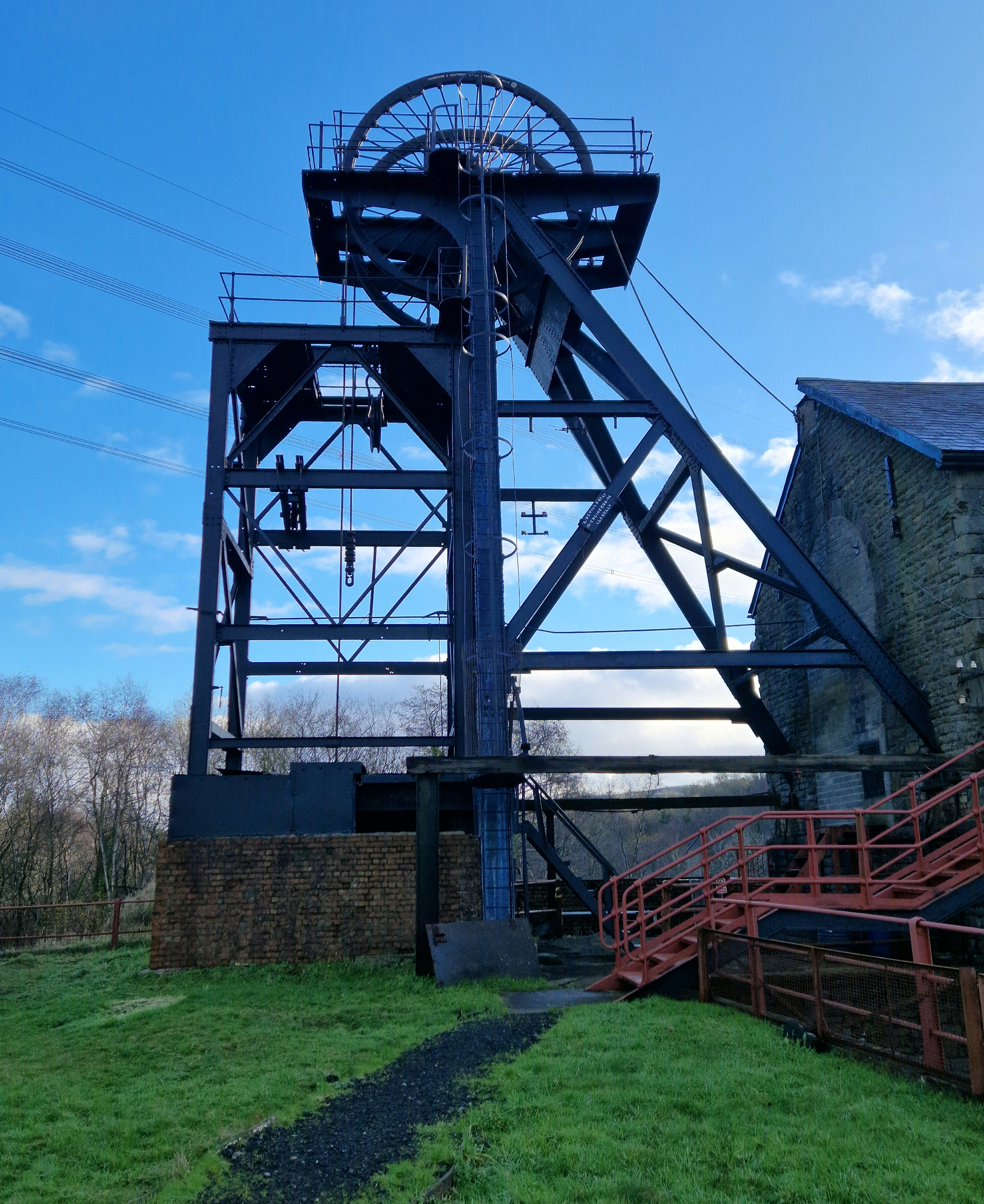
Headframe at the Great Western Colliery in Hopkinstown South Wales UK

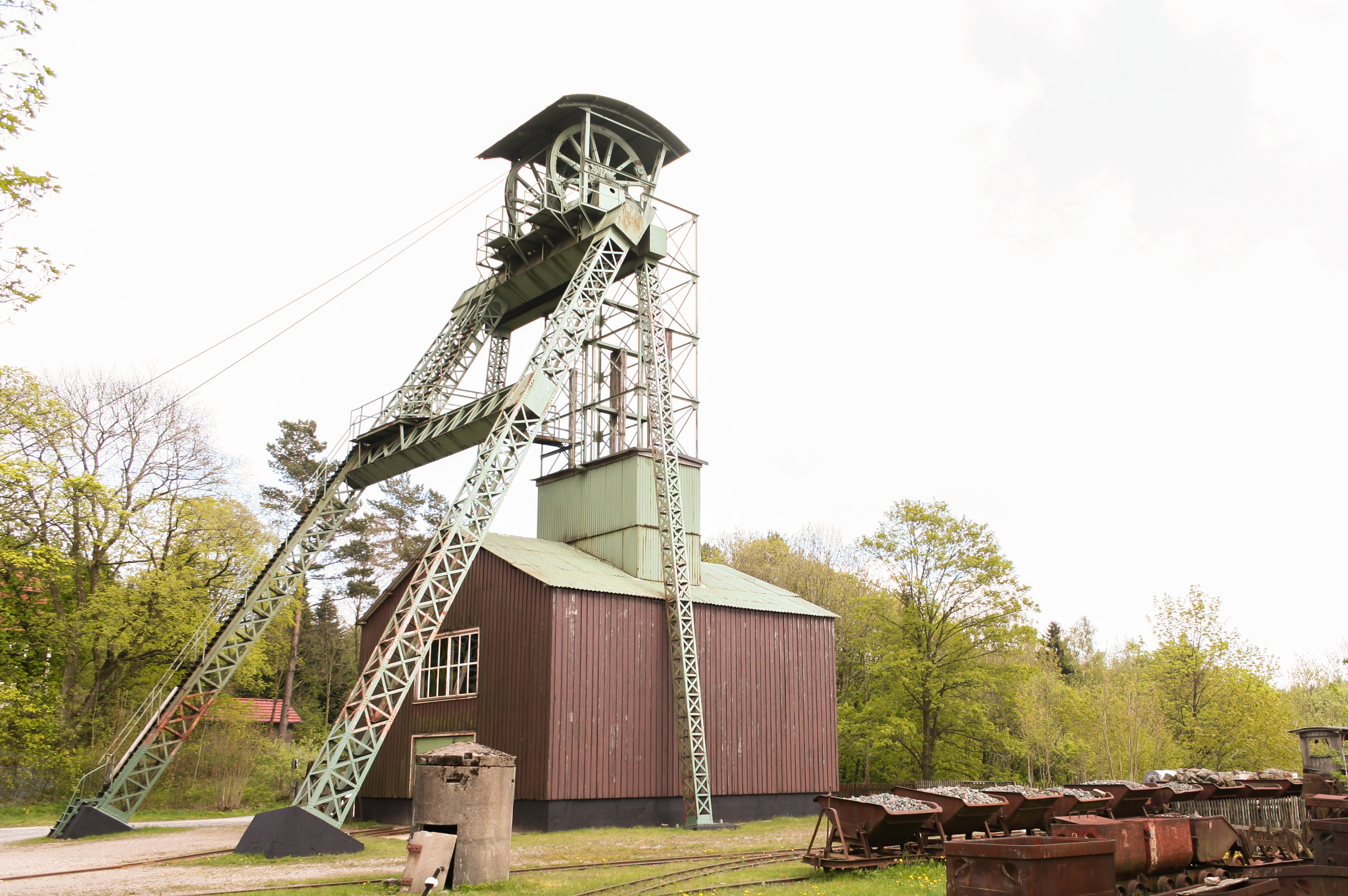
The steel headframe of the Ottiliae shaft (1876) in Clausthal-Zellerfeld, the oldest existing headframe in Germany

A headframe (gallows frame, winding tower, hoist frame, pit frame, shafthead frame, headgear, headstock, poppethead) is a tall timber, steel or concrete structure above an underground mine shaft. Headframes are built to safely handle loads from mine hoisting systems and to facilitate easy movement of rock, equipment, people and materials into and out of the mine shaft. Headframes are an iconic feature of active and former mining landscapes worldwide, often becoming symbols of their mines and communities built around them.

== Types ==
Modern headframes are made of steel, concrete, or a combination of both. Timber headframes are no longer used in industrialized countries, but are still used in developing countries. Conventionally, steel headframes are used for drum hoists, and concrete headframes are built for friction hoists; but a steel headframe can be used with a friction hoist for a shaft of smaller capacity and depth.

=== Steel ===
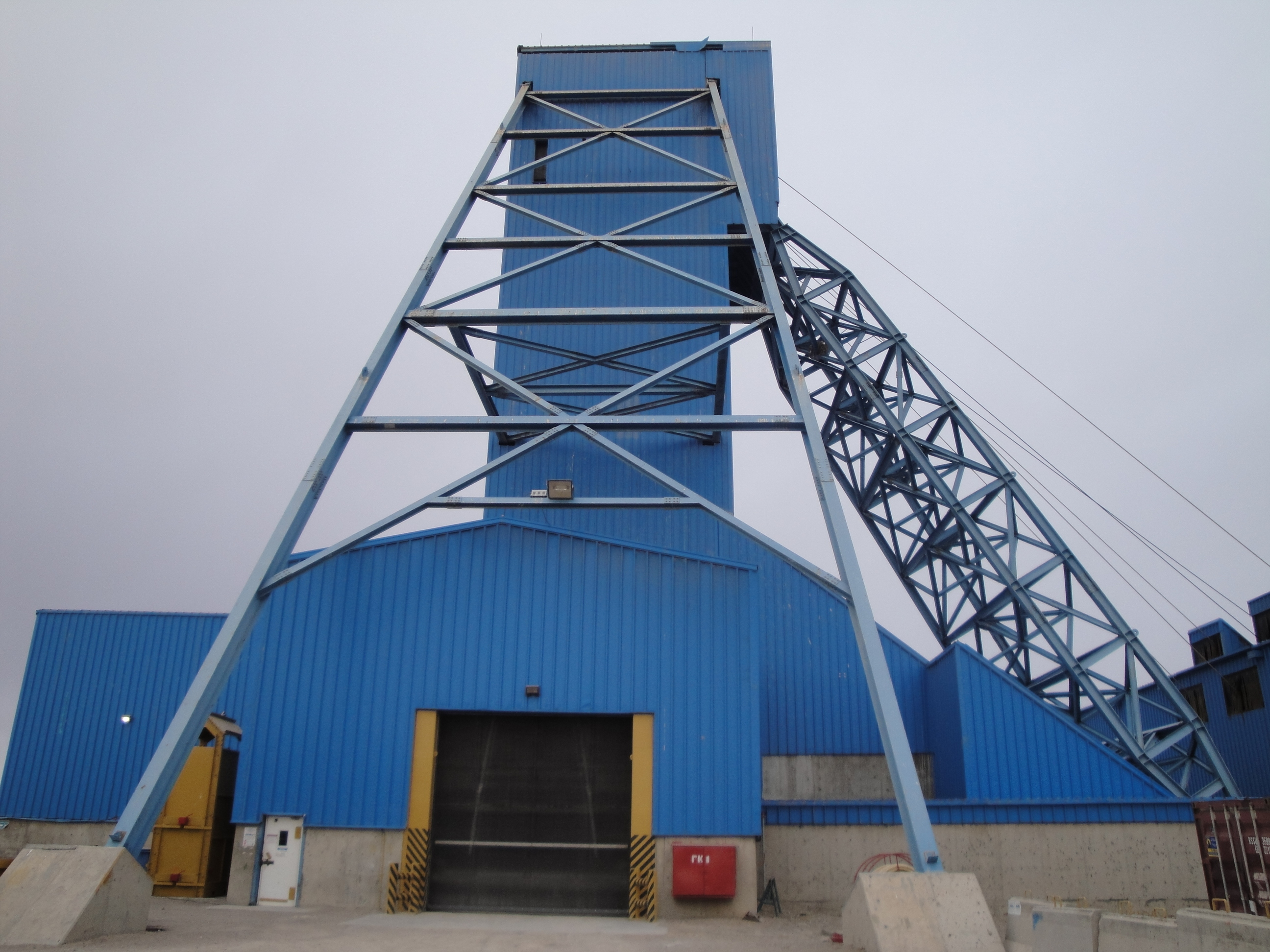
Headframe of the #1 Shaft at Oyuu Tolgoi in Mongolia

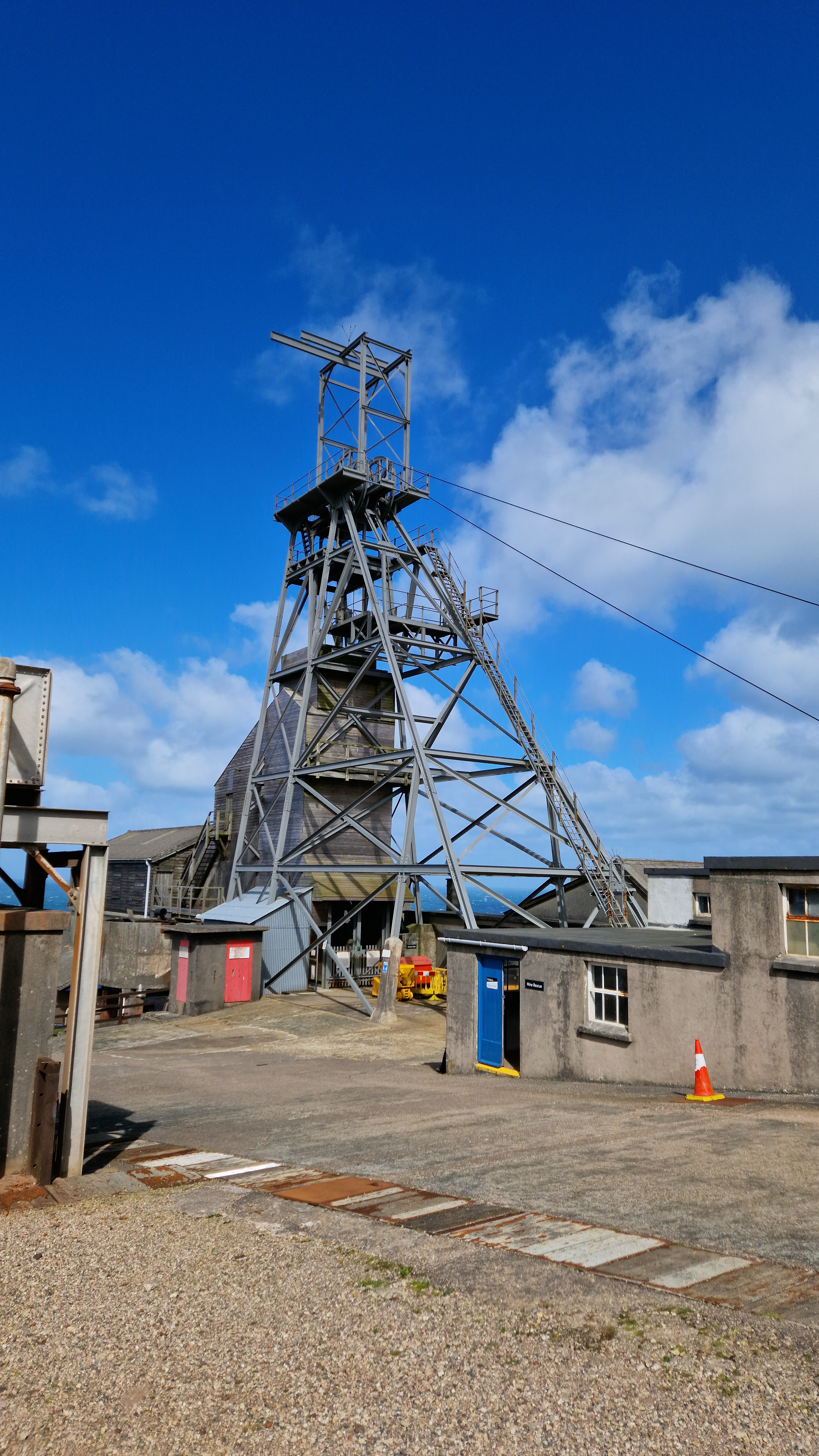
The Victory shaft headgear at Geevor Tin Mine Cornwall uk

A steel headframe is less expensive than a concrete headframe; the tallest steel headframe measures 87 m. Steel headframes are more adaptable to modifications (making any construction errors easier to remedy), and are considerably lighter, requiring less substantial foundations. As steel headframes are easier to design, they have the potential to utilize "off the shelf" design tools. Construction of a steel headframe can be easily interrupted and restarted if necessary for statutory holidays or bad weather, where slip forming concrete is not. Upon mine closure and mine reclamation a steel headframe is easier to demolish and may have value as scrap metal.

A recently erected steel headgear in the Zambian copper belt town of Chililabombwe at the Konkola number 4 shaft has a total height of 81 metres to the top of the maintenance crane rail, with the centre-line of the head sheaves at 71 metres above the collar, making it the highest steel headgear in Africa.

=== Concrete ===
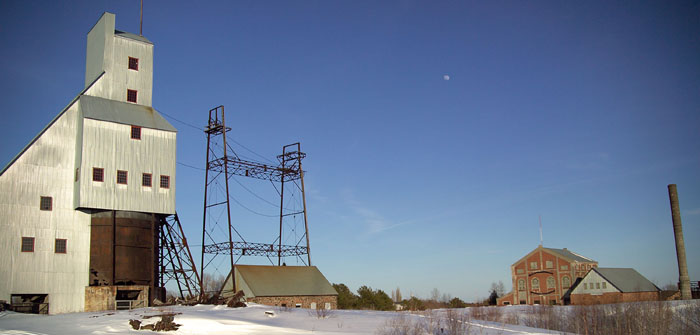
The enclosed #2 Headframe (left) and the Hoist House (right) of the Quincy Mine near Hancock, Michigan

Concrete headframes require less maintenance and are less susceptible to corrosion than steel headframes. There is much less waste of concrete during construction of a concrete headframe than there is of steel in construction of a steel headframe. Concrete headframes provide an enclosure upon construction, whereas steel headframes require cladding and insulation to protect from weather. Concrete headframes are less susceptible to vibrations and sway less during high winds. Concrete is usually more readily available than steel (except in remote locations), and the price is predictable, whereas fabricated steel prices can be volatile.

== Symbolism ==
Schematic of a headframe: 1. hoist; 2. cable; 3. wheel; 4. sheer; 5. false edge; 6. hoistroom; 7. mineshaft

Headframes have become prominent features in historic mining regions. The Ruhr district of Germany and the South Wales Valleys in Britain are both examples of areas which are now associated with headframes due to the large number constructed to mine coal during the Industrial Revolution. Most of these headframes have now been removed although both regions have turned non-operating mines with headframes into national museums; the German Mining Museum in Bochum and Big Pit National Coal Museum in Blaenavon. Sporting teams from former coal mining regions such as Llanharan RFC and Cilfynydd RFC have headframes included in their club badges.

In the United States, over a dozen headframes can still be seen around the town of Butte, Montana. Some of those headframes are illuminated at night with red LED lighting to commemorate Butte's copper mining heritage. The headframe is the town's most iconic image.

In Yellowknife, Canada, the demolition of the Con Mine headframe has met significant public opposition. The headframe was the tallest structure in the Northwest Territories and is regarded by many in the town to be an important symbol of the region's mining heritage.

== See also ==
- Hoist (mining)
- Underground mining
- Barony A Frame
- Shaft sinking
