= Hoist (mining) =

Device to raise and lower people and goods in a mine shaft

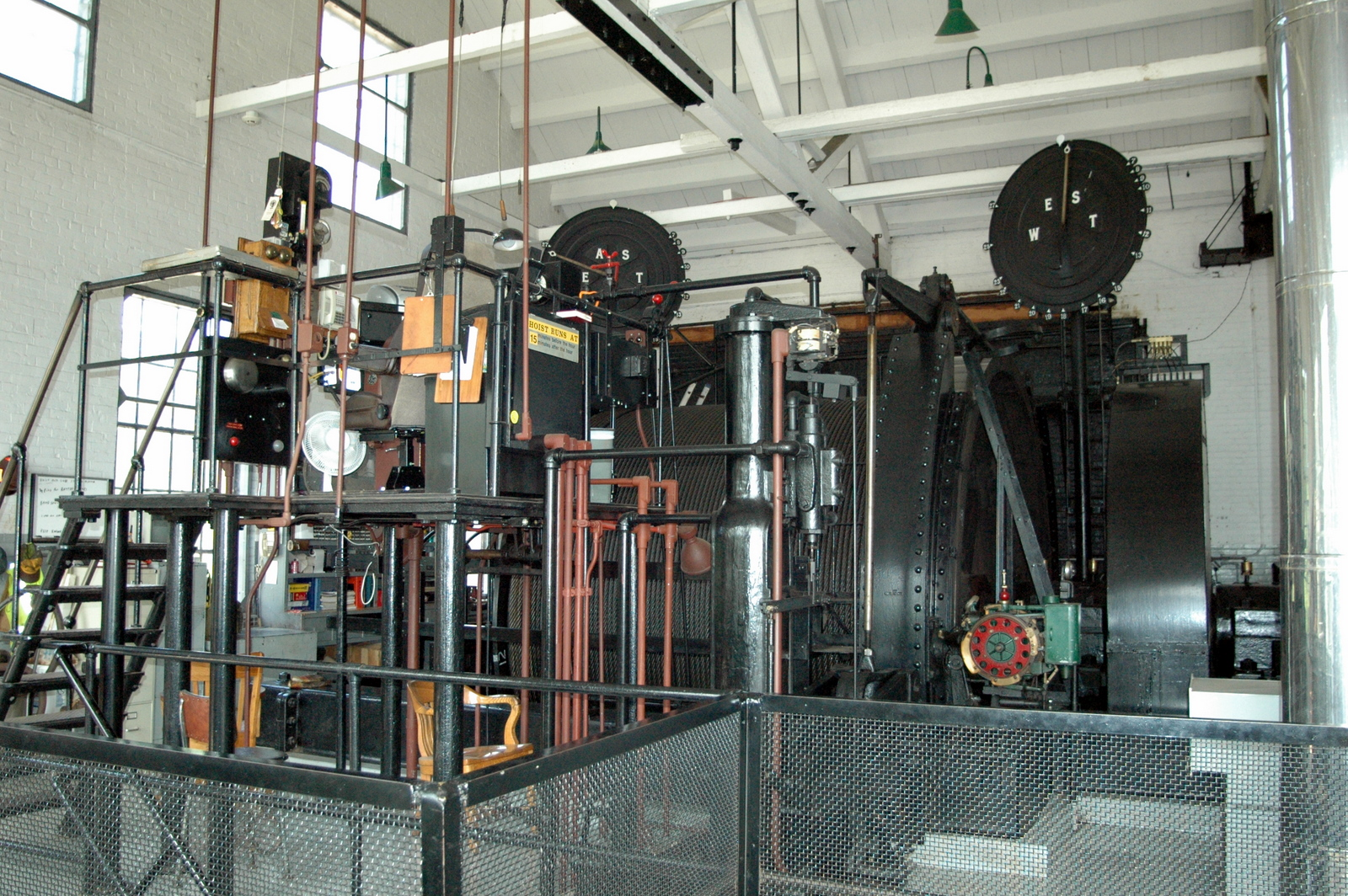
A drum hoist (steel wire rope visible) and motor

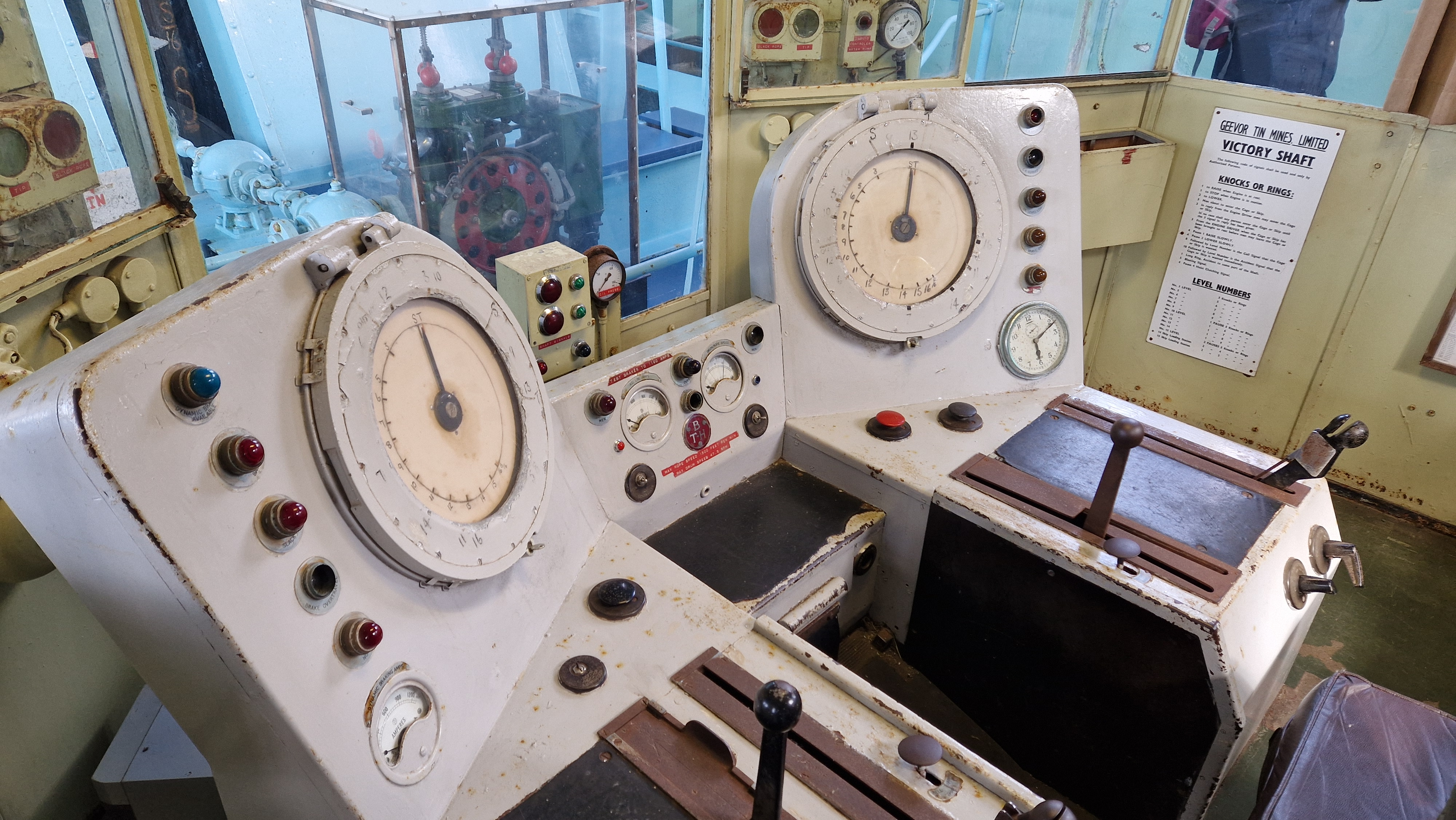
Control cabinet of the winder at Geevor Tin Mine

In underground mining a hoist or winder is used to raise and lower conveyances within the mine shaft. Modern hoists are normally powered using electric motors, historically with direct current drives utilizing Ward Leonard control machines and later solid-state converters (thyristors), although modern large hoists use alternating current drives that are variable frequency controlled. There are three principal types of hoists used in mining applications:

== Drum hoist ==
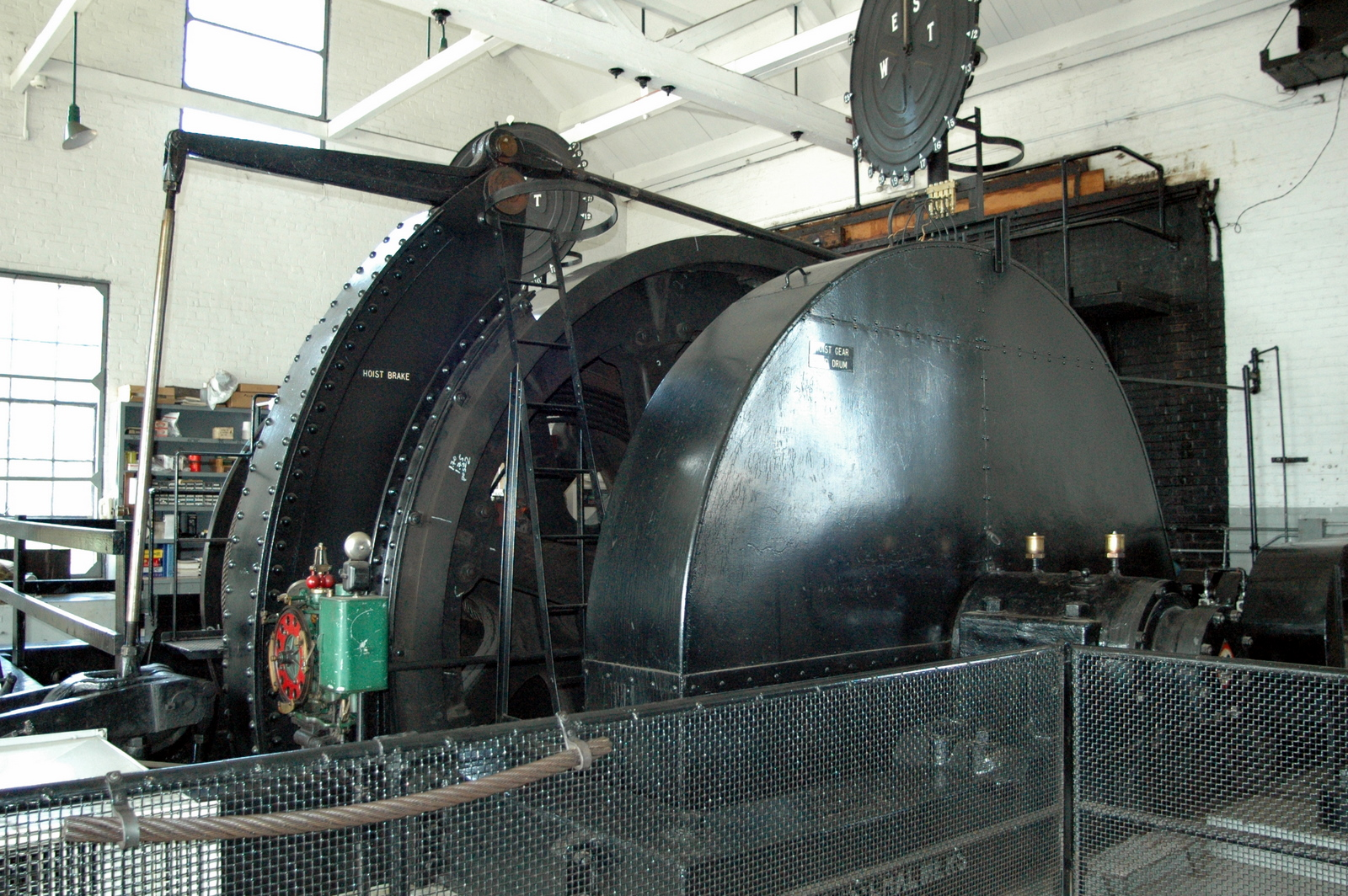
A drum hoist and motor

Drum hoists are the most common type of hoist used in North America, South Africa and South America. When using a drum hoist the hoisting cable is wound around the drum when the conveyance is lifted. Single-drum hoists can be used in smaller applications, however double-drum hoists easily allow the hoisting of two conveyances in balance (i.e. one skip being lifted while a second skip is being lowered). Drum hoists are mounted on concrete slabs within a hoistroom, the hoisting ropes run from the drum, up to the top of the headframe, over a sheave wheel and down where they connect to the conveyance (cage or skip).

=== Advantages ===
Drum hoists require less routine maintenance than a friction hoist, because the haulage cable is fixed to the drum, and therefore have less downtime, and the maintenance regime is less sophisticated. Drum hoists can continue to operate if the shaft bottom gets flooded and less shaft depth is required below the loading pocket, unlike friction hoists where such flooding could cover the tail ropes and so on. Because drum hoists do not have tail ropes, the hoisting system is more suited to slinging beneath a conveyance.

=== Disadvantages ===
Drum hoists take up more space than a friction hoist for the same service as all of the haulage cable must be accommodated on the drum when the hoist is fully raised. Drum hoists require rapid fluctuations in power demand, which can pose a problem if power is generated on site rather than provided through the main power grid.

== Friction hoist ==
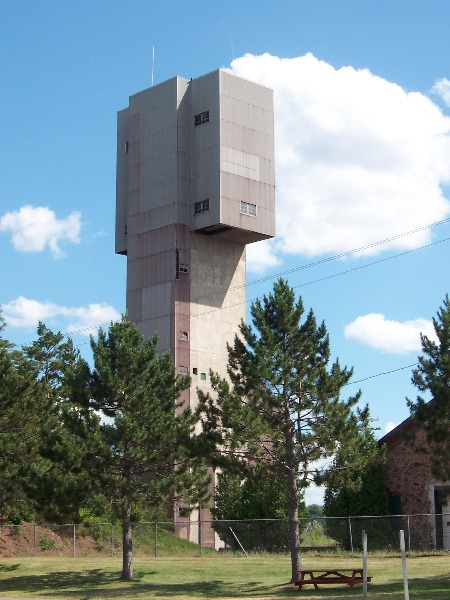
A headframe housing a friction hoist

Friction (or Koepe) hoists are the most common type of hoist used in Europe, Asia and Australia. The friction hoist was invented in 1877 by Frederick Koepe. Friction hoists are mounted on the ground above the mine shaft, or at the top of the headframe. Friction hoists utilize tail ropes and counterweights and do not have the haulage rope fixed to the wheel, but instead passed around it. The tailropes and weights offset the need for the motor to overcome the weight of the conveyance and hoisting rope, thereby reducing the required horsepower of the hoisting motor by up to 30%, with the overall power consumption remaining the same. Friction hoists, unlike drum hoists, can and normally do use multiple ropes giving them a larger payload capacity, however since they require a larger safety factor, they are impractical for very deep shafts.

=== Advantages ===
New friction hoists are less expensive than new drum hoists, and the lead time for delivery may be shorter as there is more competition for manufacturing. Multi-rope friction hoists have a larger lift capacity than a drum hoist. A friction hoist is smaller in diameter than a drum hoist for the same service, making it easier to ship and install than a drum hoist.

=== Disadvantages ===
Balanced friction hoists are not suitable for hoisting from multiple loading pockets on different horizons within a shaft, and are generally not suitable for deep shafts. Friction hoists can not operate at normal speeds if the shaft bottom is flooded and water reaches the tail ropes.

== Blair multi-rope hoist ==
The Blair multi-rope hoist (BMR hoist) is a variation of the double-drum hoist using two drums and two hoisting cables per skip. Both cables equally share the load of the skip, using a mechanism such as a balance wheel (sheave) above the skip to allow any slight variations between the two cables to equalize. The configuration was developed by Robert Blair for use with extremely deep mine shafts in South Africa. The first example was installed in 1958, and the Blair hoist is still most commonly found in South Africa.

=== Advantages ===
The use of two cables allows for a significantly smaller cable diameter than would be required with a single cable. This is partially because the load is shared by two cables, and also partially due to safety regulations that allow for a reduced safety factor with two cables. The reduced cable weight becomes advantageous in very deep shafts.

The smaller cable diameter also allows using a smaller diameter winding drum, which can be an advantage when assembling a hoist underground by lowering the components down a shaft.

=== Disadvantages ===
The double cable arrangement does not readily allow for the use of a conventional detaching hook to connect the skip to the hoisting cables. The detaching hook is a required safety mechanism that helps protect miners riding in a cage during an accidental over-wind event where the skip and cage are lifted out of the shaft. The relative incompatibility with detaching hooks or a similar safety system is a stated reason that Blair hoists are less frequently configured for hoisting workers than single or double drum hoists.

A Blair hoist requires four winding drum sections instead of only one or two. When all four drums are arranged on a single common shaft, the angles required to direct all four cables to the headframe can become unfavorable, or require placing additional distance between the hoist and the headframe. There are several approaches to resolving this problem, all of which add mechanical complexity to the hoist. One pair of drums can be staggered behind the first and connected by a geared drivetrain, or the common shaft can be interrupted by a universal joint to allow the two pairs of drums to be situated at slightly different angles. It is also possible to completely separate the two pairs of drums, and drive them using two electrically-connected motors that serve as generators or motors depending on the direction of operation.

== Examples of hoists ==
Examples of hoists

Single-drum hoist

Double-drum hoist

Friction (Koepe) hoist

Blair-multi rope hoist

Conical drum

Spiral drum

== See also ==
- Hoist (device)
- Pulley
- Winch
- Hard Rock Miner's Handbook
- Glossary of coal mining terminology
