= DAC 120 DE =

Body and chassis
- Class: Ultra class

Powertrain
- Transmission: AC Electric

Dimensions
- Length: 10 metres (32.81 ft)
- Width: 3.2 metres (10.50 ft)
- Height: 5.4 metres (17.72 ft)
- Curb weight: 90 tonnes (99 short tons)
- Max. weight loaded: 210 tonnes (230 short tons)
- Max. payload: 120 tonnes (130 short tons)
- Max. speed: 70 km/h (43 mph)

The DAC 120 DE is a diesel-electric haul truck manufactured between 1988 and 1990 by Steagul Roșu (Red Flag) Brașov Romania and by Mecanica Mârşa Works.

Designed in the 1980s by ICPAT institute Brașov (later renamed S.C. Tractor Proiect S.A.), developed from the Lectra Haul truck, it became one of the World's largest haul trucks at its time. The DAC 120 DE had an empty weight of 90 tonnes, and a maximum load capacity of 120 tonnes. It was 10 metres long and 5.4 metres tall over the canopy, with a wheelbase of 3.2 metres. The model was driven by an 8-ton, 65 litre diesel engine, capable of producing 1,040 horsepower (768 kW). The engine powered two Electroputere Craiova electric traction motors built into the rear axle. The top speed of the truck was 70 km/h empty and 55 km/h when full. The truck had two 1,600 litres fuel tanks capable of moving the DAC 120 DE (when full) on a 24 hours schedule an entire week.

The total number of trucks built was 15, of which eight went to the Roșia Poieni copper mine, three at the Mahmudia lime quarry, two at the Danube-Black Sea Canal site and five at the Mc Caimy Monster Pilbara iron ore mine in Western Australia.

The cost of a DAC 120 DE truck was around US$ 300,000 (US$ 615,000 in 2018 dollars), much cheaper than other comparable models.

== See also ==
- BelAZ 75600
- Bucyrus MT6300AC
- Caterpillar 797F
- Komatsu 960E-1
- Liebherr T 282B
- Terex 33-19 "Titan"
- Unit Rig
