= Komatsu 930E =

Komatsu 930E Series
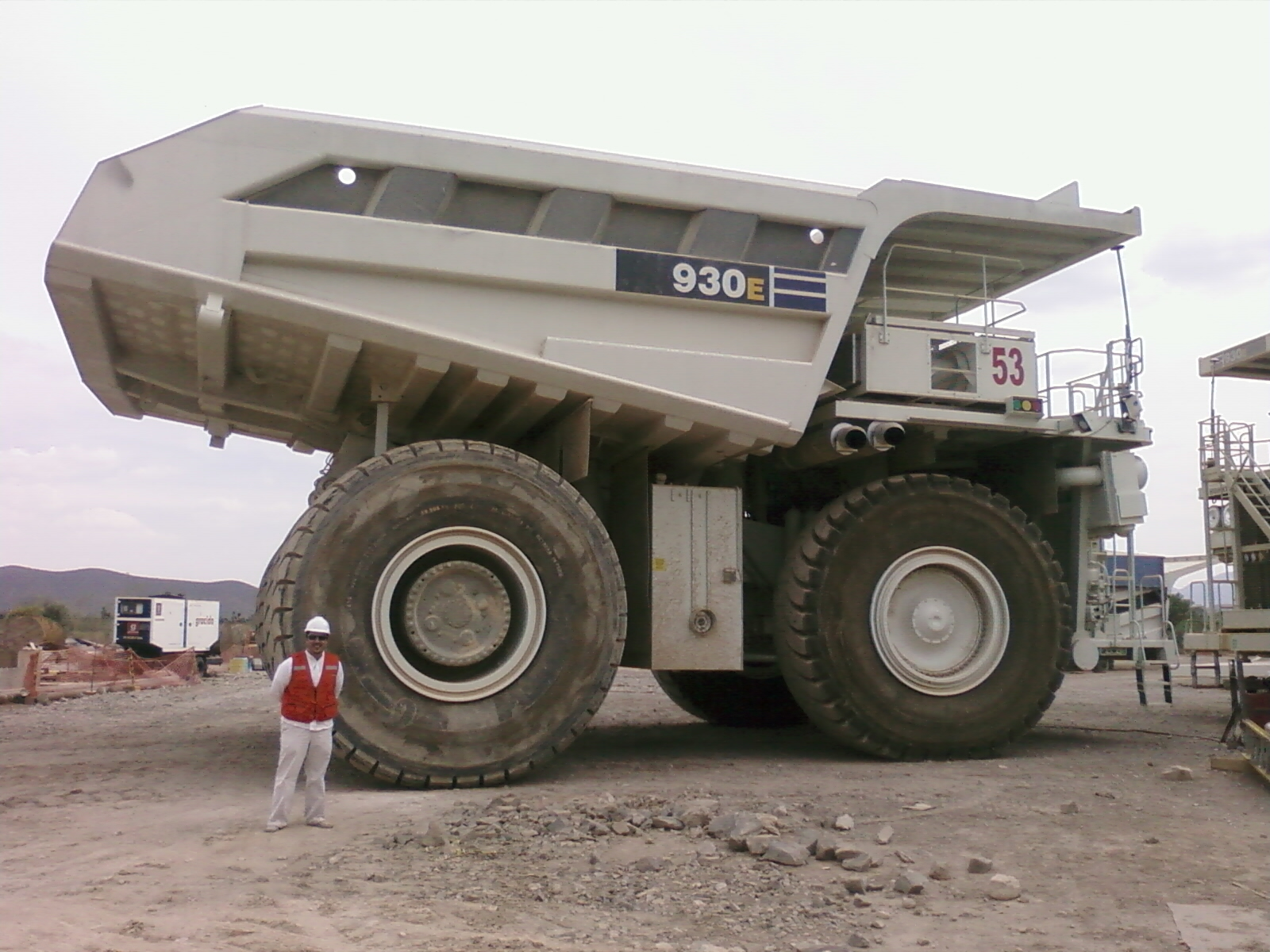

Overview
- Manufacturer: Komatsu
- Production: Since 1995
- Assembly: Peoria, IL, USA

Body and chassis
- Class: Ultra
- Body style: Dump truck
- Layout: Front engine, rear wheel drive

Powertrain
- Engine: Varies by model
- Transmission: AC electric

Dimensions
- Wheelbase: 21 ft 10 in (6.65 m)
- Length: 51 ft 2 in (15.60 m)
- Width: 30 ft 2 in (9.19 m)
- Height: 24 ft 2 in (7.37 m)
- Curb weight: 463,383 pounds (210.187 t)

The Komatsu 930E is an off-highway, ultra class, rigid frame, two-axle, diesel/AC electric powertrain haul truck designed and manufactured by Komatsu in Peoria, Illinois, United States. Although the 930E is neither Komatsu's largest nor highest payload capacity haul truck, Komatsu considers the 930E to be the flagship of their haul truck product line.

The 930E is the best selling ultra class haul truck in the world. As of September 2016, Komatsu has sold 1,900 units of 930E. The current model, the 930E-5 offer a payload capacity of up to 320 short tons (290 t).

== Public Debut ==
The 930E was introduced in Morenci, Arizona in May, 1995 with a payload capacity of up to 310 short tons (281 t).

== Innovations ==
The 930E was the first two-axle, six tire haul truck to be offered with a payload capacity in excess of 300 short tons (272 t), making it the world's first regular production "ultra class" haul truck. The 930E remained the world's largest, highest payload capacity haul truck until the September, 1998 debut of the 360 short tons (330 t) payload capacity Caterpillar 797.

Prior to the introduction of the 930E, diesel/electric haul trucks employed AC from an electric alternator where it was rectified to power the DC traction motors at the rear wheels. The 930E was the first haul truck to employ two AC electric traction motors. The diesel/electric AC powertrain is more efficient, offers better operating characteristics and is more cost effective than a comparable DC powertrain.

== Product Improvements ==
In 1996, the 930E-2 debuted, offering an increased 320 short tons (290 t) payload capacity by adding larger Bridgestone 50-80R57 radial tires. In 2000, at MINExpo International, Komatsu debuted the 930E-2SE featuring a 3,500 horsepower (2,600 kW) Komatsu SSDA18V170 V-18, twin-turbocharged, diesel engine developed by Industrial Power Alliance, a joint venture between Komatsu and Cummins. This is the same engine that powers the larger 360 short tons (327 t) Komatsu 960E-1 and allows the 930E-2SE to operate at elevations up to 12,000 ft (3,658 m) without derating. On December 15, 2003 Komatsu introduced the 930E-3, powered by a 2,700 horsepower (2,000 kW) Komatsu SSDAl6V160 V-16 engine and a GDY106 traction motor on each side of the rear axle. The current models are the 930E-4 with a 2,700 horsepower (2,000 kW) Komatsu SSDAl6V160 V-16 diesel engine and the 930E-4SE with a 3,500 horsepower (2,600 kW) Komatsu SSDA18V170 V-18 diesel engine.

== Assembly ==
All Komatsu electric drive haul trucks, including the 930E, are manufactured at Komatsu America Corp's Peoria Manufacturing Operation located at 2300 NE Adams Street in Peoria, Illinois, USA.

== Standing in the Komatsu model lineup ==
The 930E was the largest, highest capacity haul truck in Komatsu's model lineup prior to the May 27, 2008 introduction of the 3,500 horsepower (2,600 kW), 360 short tons (327 t) payload capacity 960E-1. The 320 short tons (290 t) payload capacity 930-E4 and 930E-4SE are now the second highest payload capacity haul trucks in Komatsu's line up, although the 930E-4SE uses the same 3,500 horsepower (2,600 kW) Komatsu SSDA18V170 V-18 engine as the 960E-1.

== Specifications ==
Komatsu 930E specifications
Capacity	290,000 kilograms (320 short tons)
Drive type	Diesel-electric
Power	2,014 kilowatts (2,701 hp)
Top speed	65 kilometres per hour (40 mph)
Maximum elevation	3,700 metres (12,100 ft)
First introduced	1996

== See also ==
- Haul truck
- Komatsu Limited
