= V18 engine =

Piston engine with 18 cylinders in vee configuration

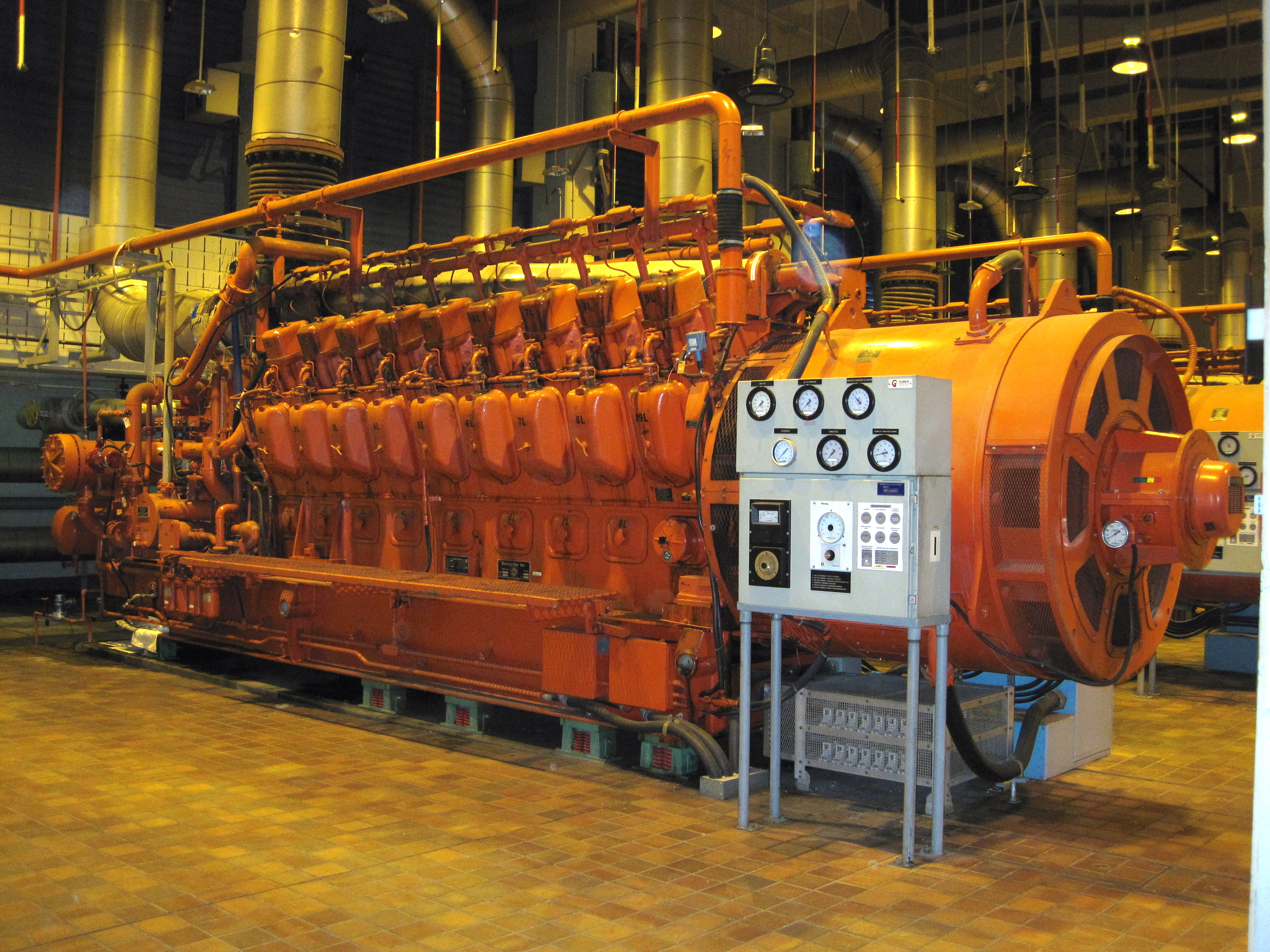
A 3,400 hp (2.5 MW) ALCO 18-251 engine being used as a backup electrical generator at a wastewater plant in Montreal.

A V18 engine is an eighteen-cylinder piston engine where two banks of nine cylinders are arranged in a V configuration around a common crankshaft.

The V18 engine is a rare configuration and is primarily used in large diesel engines running at low operating speeds. These large V18 diesel engines have seen limited use in haul trucks, electricity generation, rail transport, and marine propulsion.

There are no known automobiles that have used V18 engines and no engine manufacturer has developed or produced a V18 engine for use in automobiles.

While the V18 is a more uncommon engine configuration, there are more common eighteen-cylinder engine configurations such as the W18, which has seen use in both automobiles and aircraft, and the Deltic, an opposed-piston eighteen-cylinder diesel engine created by D. Napier & Son which was used for a variety of applications.

== Examples ==
Name	Displacement	Power output	Fuel	Notes
ALCO 18-251	12,024 cu in (197.04 L)	4,500 hp (3.36 MW)	Diesel	Originally designed and manufactured by American Locomotive Company; now manufactured by Fairbanks-Morse.
Caterpillar 3618	20,320 cu in (333 L)	9,655 hp (7.2 MW)	Diesel	Out of production
Cummins QSK78	4,735 cu in (77.59 L)	3,500 hp (2.61 MW)	Diesel	Derived from the V16 QSK60. Marketed by Komatsu as the SSDA18V170.
Fairbanks-Morse Colt-Pielstick PC2.5	63,510 cu in (1,040 L)	11,700 hp (8.73 MW)	Diesel	In production
MAN V32/44CR	39,055 cu in (643 L)	14,483 hp (10.8 MW)	Diesel	In production
Wärtsilä 18V50DF	125,000 cu in (2,050 L)	23,530 hp (17.55 MW)	Diesel or natural gas	Available for both marine propulsion and power generation, and used in e.g. Humboldt Bay power station.
Paxman Valenta 18RP200	7,230 cu in (118.44 L)	4,901 hp (3,655 MW)	Diesel	Out of production, used for marine propulsion and power generation.

The BelAZ 75600 and Liebherr T 282B haul trucks are powered by the Cummins QSK78 engine, while the Komatsu 960E-1 haul truck is powered by the Komatsu SSDA18V170 engine.

In 1971, Canadian locomotive manufacturer MLW-Worthington produced the MLW M-640 prototype diesel-electric locomotive powered by a 4,000 hp (3.0 MW) ALCO 18-251 engine, however the locomotive did not reach production.

== See also ==
- W18 engine
