= Terex THS15 Motorscraper =

The Terex THS15 Motorscraper was a concept machine scraper displayed for the first time at Minexpo 2000. This machine features some unusual design concepts, including an adjustable cutting edge on the bowl to reduce friction when loading. Other notable features were the rear-mounted drivetrain (there was no engine on the front module) and a hydrostatic transmission, with hydraulic wheel motors. At least two prototypes were made, with noticeable differences in front-end styling. A digital copy of the brochure for this machine is available through ozebooks. Both the THS15 scrapers were spotted for sale in used machinery dealers by 2011, and their fate is unknown. Terex did not manufacture any, and subsequently abandoned motor scraper manufacture altogether.

== Transmission ==
Hydrostatic transmissions have many benefits; however, they are not usually suited to machines that travel at higher speeds over longer distances. The hydrostatic drive may have been a contributing factor in abandoning the project. Changes in the way earthmoving is done, including the use of excavators and dumptrucks, also eroded the market for scrapers. The THS15 had many revolutionary design concepts, but was probably too costly to put into production in a declining market sector.
