= BelAZ 75710 =

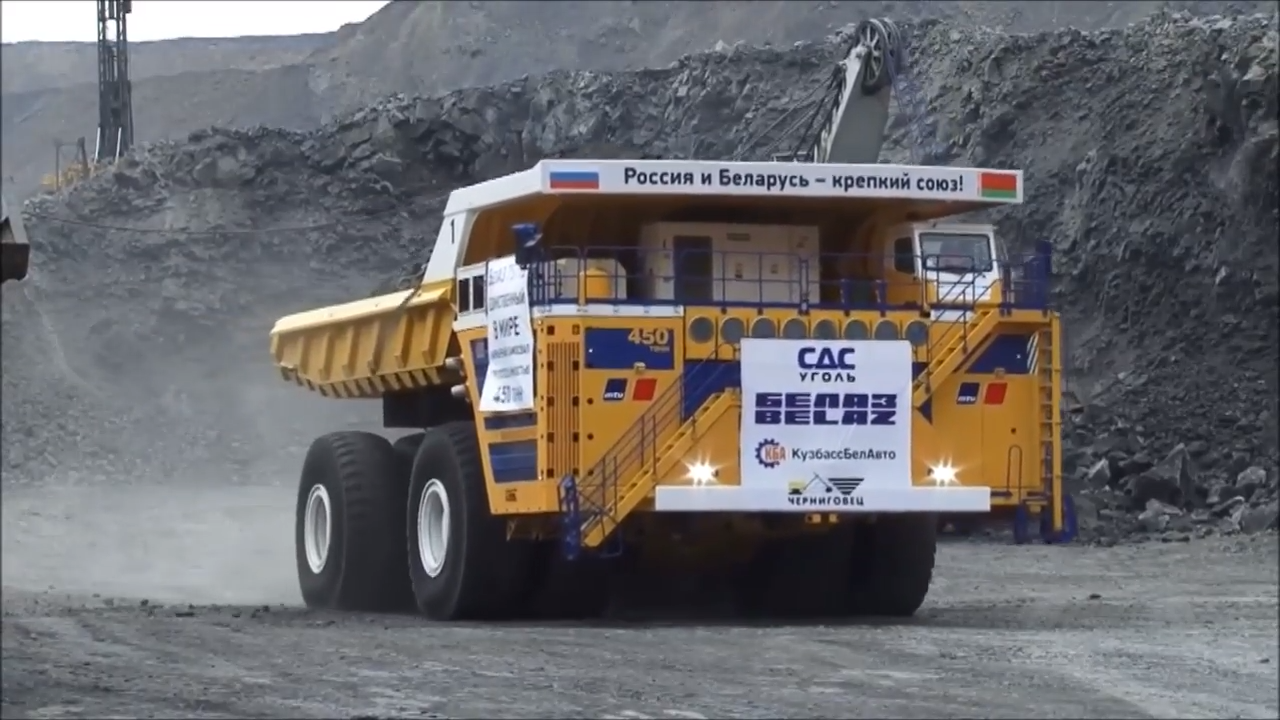

Overview
- Type: Haul truck
- Manufacturer: BelAZ
- Production: 2013–present
- Assembly: Belarus: Zhodzina

Body and chassis
- Class: Ultra class
- Layout: Front-engine, four-wheel drive

Powertrain
- Engine: 2 × MTU DD16V4000 V16 diesel
- Transmission: Siemens MMT500
- Propulsion: Diesel-Electric

Dimensions
- Wheelbase: 8 m (26 ft 3 in)
- Length: 20.6 m (67 ft 7 in)
- Width: 9.87 m (32 ft 4 5/8 in)
- Height: 8.26 m (27 ft 1 1/4 in)
- Curb weight: 360000 kg (793664 lb)

The BelAZ 75710 is an ultra class haul truck manufactured in Belarus by BelAZ. As of 2013, it was the world's largest, highest payload capacity haul truck.

== Design ==
The BelAZ 75710 has a conventional two-axle setup but the wheels are doubled, one to an axle, imitating the 1950s International Payhauler 350. For this reason, it needs two 59/80R63 tires. It also has four-wheel drive and four-wheel hydraulic steering which is unusual. It has a turning radius of about 31 m (102 ft).

The 75710 is claimed to carry a 450-tonne (440-long-ton; 500-short-ton) load. With an empty weight of 360 tonnes (350 long tons; 400 short tons), it is much heavier than BelAZ's previous largest model, the 7560, which weighed 240 tonnes (240 long tons; 260 short tons) when empty. It is 20.6 m (67 ft 7 in) long, 8.16 m (26 ft 9 1/4 in) high, and 9.87 m (32 ft 4 5/8 in) wide. The bed is relatively shallow, limiting the volume of material that can be carried.

Instead of a single engine, the Siemens MMT 600 drive system is powered by two MTU 65-litre (4,000 cu in) 16-cylinder four stroke diesel engines, each with 2,300 horsepower (1,700 kW). These are coupled to two AC alternators and four AC traction motors (two in each axle.) Fuel consumption (according to company data) is 198 g/kWh (55 g/MJ), equivalent to 1,300 l/100 km, with the option to run on only one if carrying less than capacity loads. Maximum claimed speed is 64 km/h (40 mph), and economy maximum speed (when fully loaded and on a 10% gradient) is 40 km/h (25 mph).

== Project history ==
BelAZ produces the 75710 in a new facility constructed by Soligorsk Construction Trust No. 3. Overall, BelAZ has invested $954 million in increasing its total production capacity.

Previously the world's largest haul trucks were the Bucyrus MT6300AC, Liebherr T 282B and Caterpillar 797F ultra-class trucks, with load capacities of 400 short tons (360 t).

== Specifications ==
Length × width × height, mm (ft)	20,600 mm × 9,870 mm × 8,260 mm (67.59 ft × 32.38 ft × 27.10 ft)
Turning radius, m (ft)	19.8 m (65 ft)
Carrying capacity, t (short tons)	450 t (500 short tons)
Gross weight, t (short tons)	840.5 t (926.5 short tons)
Body volume geometric, m³ (ft³)	164.9 m^{3} (5,820 ft^{3})
Body volume with a "cap" 2:1, m³ (ft³)	268.3 m^{3} (9,470 ft^{3})
Tires	59/80R63
Wheels	44,00—63/50
Suspension	pneumohydraulic, shock absorber diameter - 1,700 mm (5 ft 7 in)
Fuel tank volume, l (US gallons)	2 × 2,800 L (740 US gal)
Fuel consumption, l/100 km (mpg)	1,300 l/100 km (0.18 mpg_{‑US})
Maximum speed, km/h (mph)	64 km/h (40 mph)
Powerplant
Diesel engine model	2 × MTU Detroit Diesel 16V4000
Diesel power, kW (hp)	1,715 kW (2,300 hp) each
Traction unit model	Siemens MMT500
Traction generator model	2 × YJ177A
Traction generator power, kW (hp)	1,704 kW (2,285 hp) each
Wheel motor model	4 × 1TB3026-0G-03
Motor-wheel power, kW (hp)	1,200 kW (1,600 hp) each
