= Bucyrus MT6300AC =

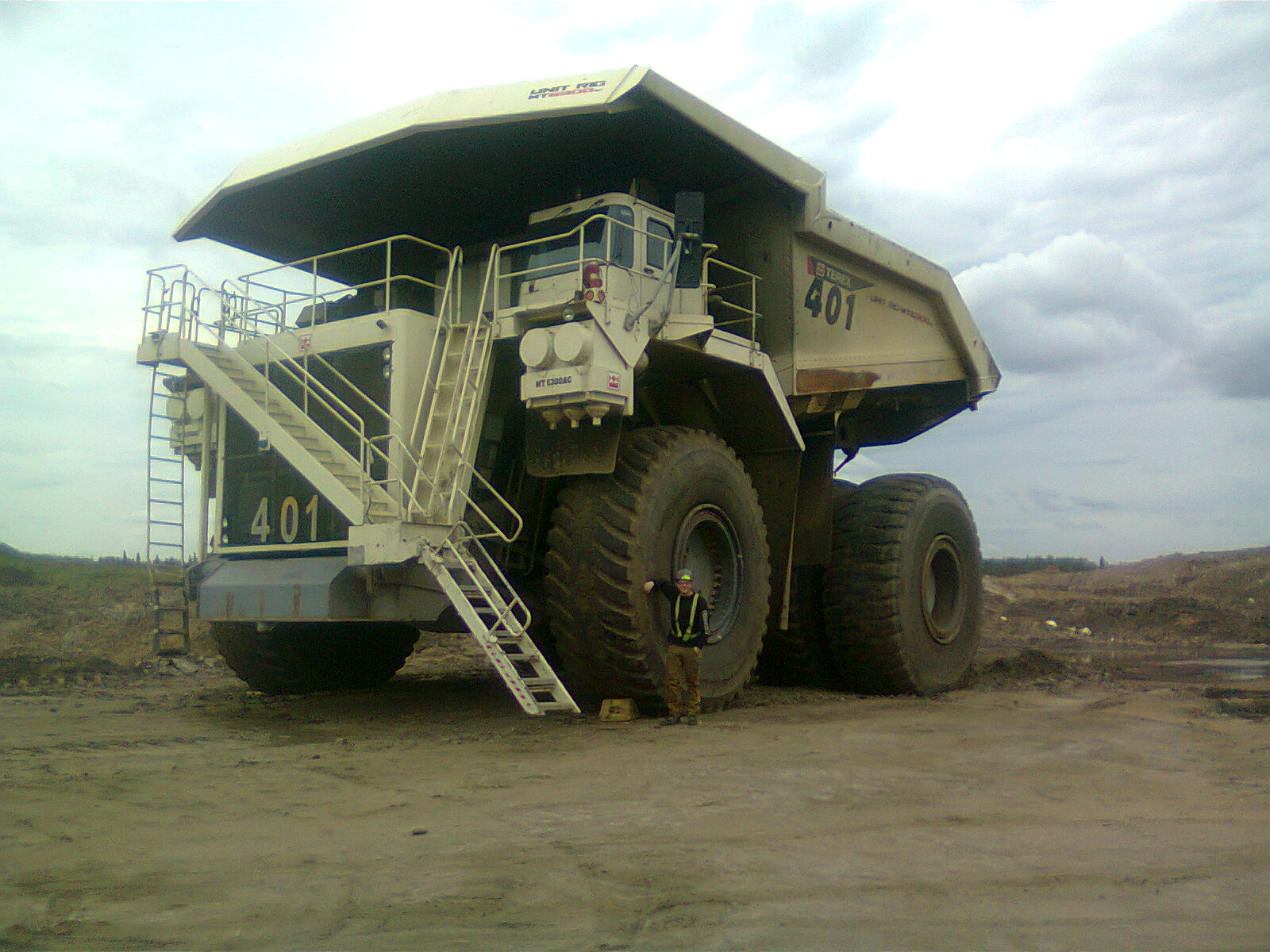

Overview
- Manufacturer: Bucyrus International Inc.
- Production: September 2008-present
- Assembly: North America

Body and chassis
- Class: Ultra class
- Body style: Dump truck
- Layout: Front engine, rear wheel drive

Powertrain
- Engine: Detroit Diesel/MTU 20V4000; Arrangement: V-20; Power: 3,750 horsepower (2,800 kW)
- Transmission: AC Electric

Dimensions
- Wheelbase: 21 ft 10 in (6.65 m)
- Length: 51 ft 1 in (15.57 m)
- Width: 31 ft 10 in (9.70 m)
- Height: 26 ft (7.92 m)
- Curb weight: 1,330,000 lb (603,300 kg)

The Bucyrus MT6300AC is an off-highway, ultra class, two-axle, diesel/AC electric powertrain haul truck designed and manufactured by Bucyrus International Inc. in the United States. The MT6300AC is Bucyrus' largest, highest payload capacity haul truck, offering one of the largest haul truck payload capacities in the world, up to 400 short tons (363 t). The closest analogs are Liebherr T 282B, Caterpillar 797F, which can carry the same weight, and BelAZ 75710 with 450 tons payload capacity.

On February 19, 2010, the Terex Unit Rig MT6300AC was re-branded as the Bucyrus MT6300AC when Bucyrus International Inc. acquired the mining equipment division of Terex Corporation.

On July 8, 2011, Bucyrus became a division of Caterpillar. The Bucyrus AC line became known as Caterpillar's UnitRig line.

== Public debut ==
Terex Corporation's Terex Mining division debuted the Terex Unit Rig MT6300AC at MINExpo International in September, 2008. Prior to the introduction of the MT6300AC and the Caterpillar 797F at MINExpo International in September, 2008, the Liebherr T 282B, introduced in 2004, was the only haul truck with a payload capacity of 363 t (400 short tons).

== Re-branding ==
On February 19, 2010, the Terex Unit Rig MT6300AC was re-branded as the Bucyrus MT6300AC when Bucyrus International Inc. acquired the mining equipment division of Terex Corporation.

== Powertrain ==
The MT6300AC employs a diesel/AC electric powertrain. A 3,750 horsepower (2,800 kW) MTU/DDC C3 Series 20V4000 four-stroke diesel engine powers an AC electric alternator which provides power to a triple reduction geared electric motor located at each side of the rear axle. Fully loaded, the MT6300AC's can reach a top speed of 40 mph (64 km/h).

== Specifications ==
Bucyrus MT6300AC Specifications
Specification	
Public Introduction	2008
Nominal Payload Capacity	400 short tons (363 t)
Gross Machine Operating Weight	1,330,000 lb (603,300 kg)
Engine Make & Model	MTU/DDC 20V4000
Engine Arrangement	V-20
Engine Power	3,750 hp (2,796 kW) net
Top Speed (Loaded)	40 mph (64 km/h)
Overall Height to Top of Canopy (Empty)	26 ft 0 in (7.92 m)
Overall Height (Body Raised)	44 ft 4 in (13.51 m)
Overall Length	51 ft 1 in (15.57 m)
Overall Width	31 ft 10 in (9.70 m)
Fuel Capacity	1,300 US gal (4,921 L)
Tire Size	59/80R63

== See also ==
- Haul truck
