= Caterpillar 797 =

Off-highway ultra-class haul truck

Caterpillar 797 Series
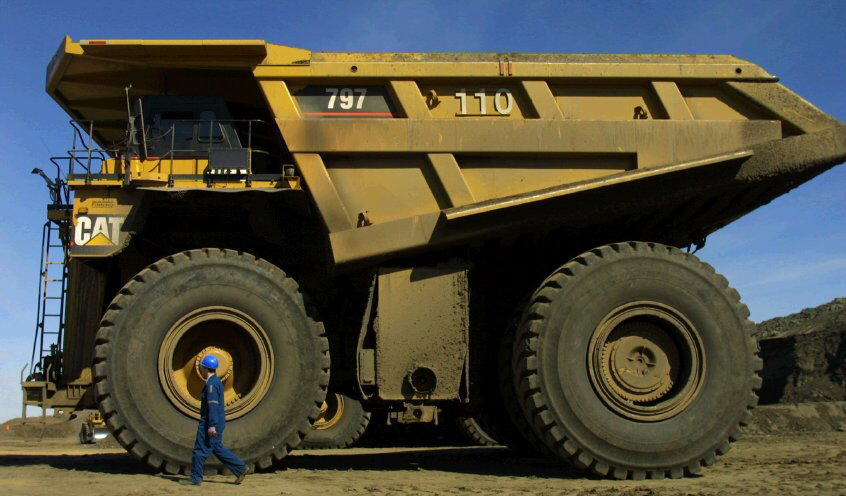
- Caterpillar 797

Overview
- Manufacturer: Caterpillar Inc.
- Production: September 22, 1998-present
- Assembly: Decatur, Illinois

Body and chassis
- Class: Ultra class
- Body style: Dump
- Layout: Front engine, rear wheel drive

Powertrain
- Transmission: Seven speed planetary gearset

The Caterpillar 797 is a series of off-highway, ultra class, two-axle, mechanical powertrain haul trucks developed and manufactured in the United States by Caterpillar Inc. specifically for high-production mining and heavy construction applications worldwide. In production since 1998, the 797 series represents Caterpillar’s largest, highest capacity haul trucks. The current, third-generation model, the 797F, offers one of the largest haul truck payload capacities in the world, up to 400 short tons (363 t) and has the highest payload capacity among mechanical drive haul trucks.

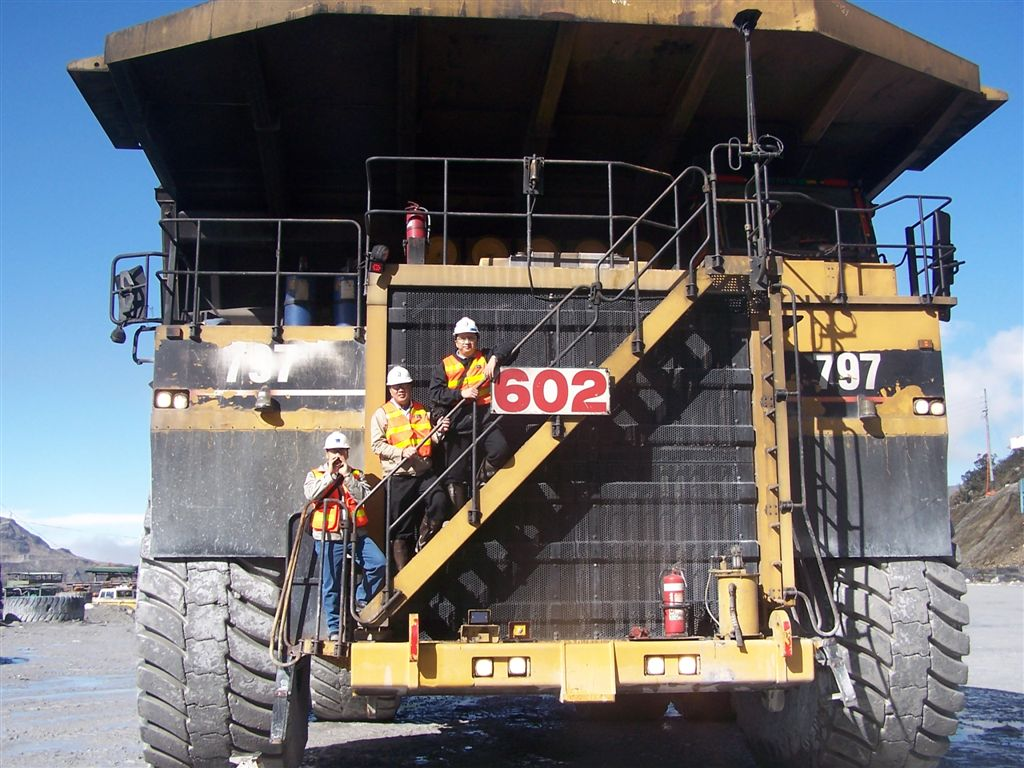
Caterpillar 797

== Initial development ==
In 1997, Caterpillar decided to begin the development of a 360 short tons (327 t) payload capacity haul truck to meet the demand from large-scale mine operators wanting to reduce operating costs at mines using 80 to 90 short tons (73 to 82 t) per pass shovels. Engineers at Caterpillar's Mining & Construction Equipment Division in Decatur, Illinois, created a new design for the 797 using computer-aided design technology. This was the first time CAD tools had been used extensively to design a Caterpillar truck.

== 797 (1998–2002) ==
Caterpillar first unveiled a completed 797 on September 29, 1998, at its assembly plant in Decatur, Illinois. The first two 797s produced were transported to Caterpillar's Arizona proving grounds for testing. In the second quarter of 1999, the third and fourth 797s produced were the first to be placed in service with a customer at the Bingham Canyon Mine in Utah. Caterpillar put 18 additional 797s into service with mine operators worldwide, as production development units.

Caterpillar began marketing the 797 in North America in 2000, with full worldwide marketing following in 2001. The first generation serial number prefix is 5YW.

== 797B (2002–2009) ==
Caterpillar introduced the 797B in the spring of 2002, replacing the first-generation 797. The 797B's increased payload capacity of 345 t (380 short tons) is a 18.1 t (20 short tons) increase over the first generation 797. Caterpillar increased the power output of the Cat 3524B EUI 24-cylinder diesel engine used in the 797 from net 2,394 kW (3,211 hp) to net 2,513 kW (3,370 hp) enabling the 797B to achieve a 68 km/h (42 mph) top speed when transporting a 345 t (380 short tons) load, a 3.2 km/h (2 mph) increase over the first generation 797.

The first 797B units entered service with customers in October 2002.

== 797F (2009–present) ==
Caterpillar introduced the 797F to the public at MINExpo International in September, 2008. The 797F replaced its predecessor model, the 797B, when the 797F entered full production in late 2009. Prior to the introduction of the Caterpillar 797F and the Bucyrus MT6300AC at MINExpo International in September, 2008, the Liebherr T 282B, introduced in 2004, was the only haul truck with a payload capacity of 400 short tons (363 t).

Compared to the 797B, the 797F has a higher payload capacity and a more powerful, more efficient engine. These changes allowed Caterpillar to meet mine operator's needs to increase operational efficiency and reduce costs by increasing the amount of material hauled per trip.

The 797F's increased payload capacity of 400 short tons (363 t) is a 20 short tons (18.1 t) increase over the 797B.

Caterpillar replaced the gross 3,550 hp (2,647 kW) [net 3,370 hp (2,513 kW)] Cat 3524B EUI 24-cylinder diesel engine used in the 797B with the gross 4,000 hp (2,983 kW) [net 3,793 hp (2,828 kW)] Cat C175-20 ACERT 20-cylinder diesel engine, enabling the 797F to maintain the 42 mph (68 km/h) top speed of the 797B while transporting a heavier 400 short tons (363 t) payload.

== Powertrain ==
The Caterpillar 797 series trucks employ mechanical drive powertrains in contrast to the diesel-electric powertrains of similar haul trucks offered by competitors. During initial development in 1997, a diesel-electric powertrain was considered for the 797, but this powertrain configuration was not developed because Caterpillar considered a mechanical drive powertrain more appropriate for market conditions at that time.

=== 797 engine ===
A gross 3,400 hp (2,535 kW) [net 3,211 hp (2,394 kW)] Cat 3524B HD EUI 24-cylinder, electronic unit injection, quad single-stage turbocharged, liquid aftercooled, four-stroke diesel engine powers the 797. The Cat 3524B HD engine is a tandem unit consisting of two 12-cylinder Cat 3512B HD engine blocks coupled to operate as a single engine with a combined displacement of 106 liters (6468 cubic inches).

=== 797B engine ===
A gross 3,550 hp (2,647 kW) [net 3,370 hp (2,513 kW)], quad turbocharged Caterpillar 3524B engine powers the 797B. The power rating of the 3524B is valid up to an elevation of 8,500 ft (2,591 m) or 15,000 ft (4,572 m) with a high altitude arrangement.

=== 797F engine ===
A gross 4,000 hp (2,983 kW) [net 3,793 hp (2,828 kW)] Cat C175-20 ACERT single block, 20-cylinder, electronic common rail injection, quad turbocharged, air-to-air aftercooled, four-stroke diesel engine powers the 797F. The power rating of the C175-20 is valid up to an elevation of 7,000 ft (2,134 m) or up to 16,000 ft (4,877 m) with a high altitude arrangement.

=== Transmission ===
The 797 series haul trucks are equipped with a rear-axle-mounted, computer-controlled, seven-speed planetary transmission with a separate lock-up torque converter. Both transmission and torque converter use a common powertrain oil.

== Wheels and tires ==
Each 797 wheel is attached to the axle using 54 - 36 mm (1.4 in) nuts that are torqued to 2,300 lb⋅ft (3,118 N⋅m). A size 55/80R63 radial tire was developed by Michelin in conjunction with Caterpillar specifically for the first generation 797. The Caterpillar 797B and 797F run 4.028 m (13.22 ft) tall, 5,300 kg (11,680 lb) Michelin 59/80R63 XDR. Most first generation 797s have been retrofitted to use the 59/80R63 tires as well. Six tires are required per truck at a cost in 2009 of approximately US$42,500 per tire.

== Manufacturing and assembly ==
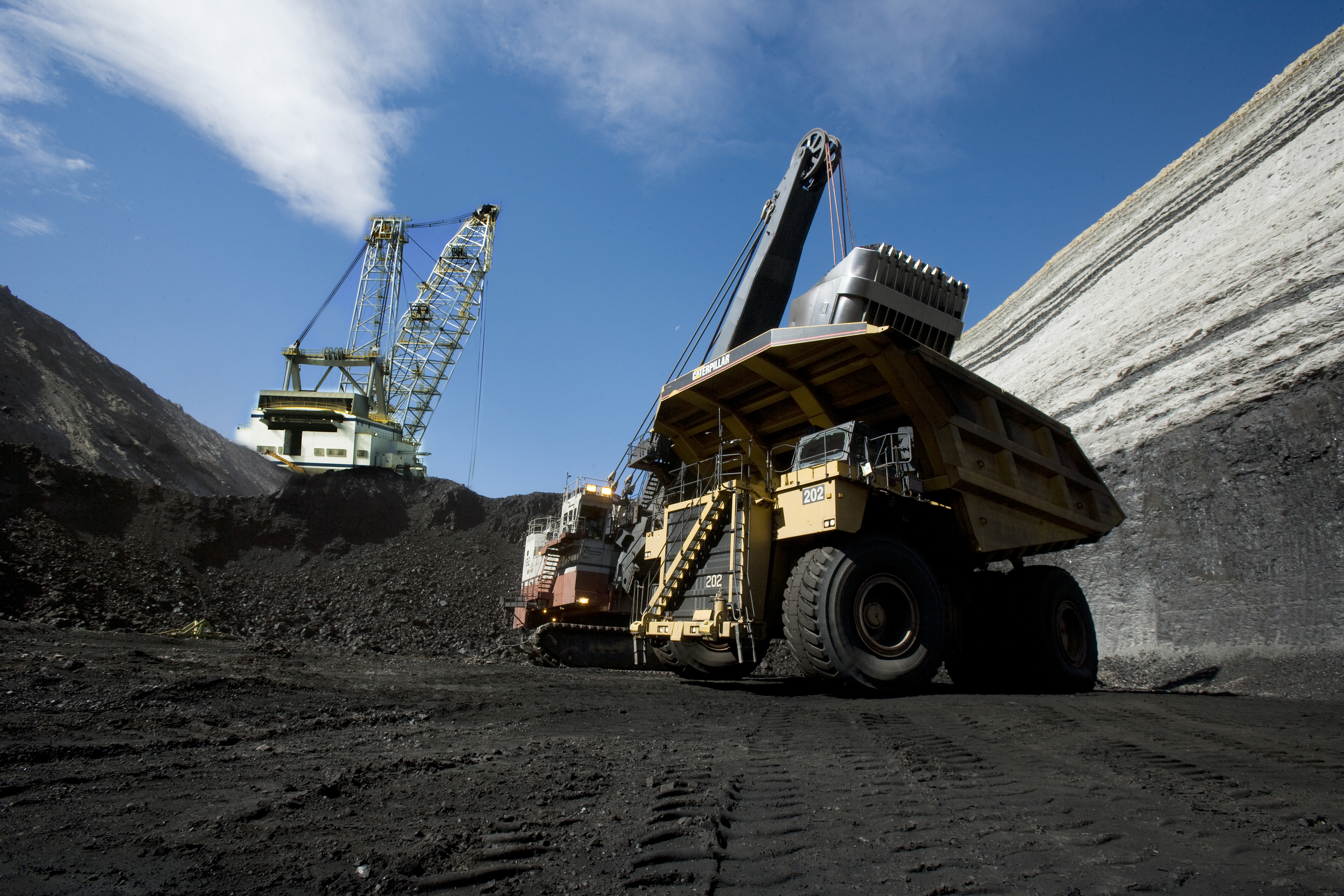
CAT 797 haul truck at the North Antelope Rochelle opencut coal mine.

Major components of the 797 are manufactured and assembled at seven Caterpillar or supplier facilities located throughout North America, then shipped to the customer site for final assembly by Caterpillar technicians.

The engine is manufactured by Caterpillar in Lafayette, Indiana, and is then shipped to Caterpillar's assembly plant in Decatur, Illinois.

The transmission and torque converter are manufactured by Caterpillar in East Peoria, Illinois, and is then shipped to Caterpillar's assembly plant in Decatur, Illinois.

The axle assemblies are manufactured by Caterpillar in Winston-Salem, North Carolina, and are shipped to the customer site.

The tires are manufactured by Michelin North America at the US7 Earthmover Manufacturing plant in Lexington, South Carolina, and are shipped to the customer site.

The driver's cab is manufactured by Bergstrom Climate Control Systems' Contract Assembly division in Joliet, Illinois. Each cab is assembled by one person and requires forty hours to complete. The cab is shipped to the customer site.

The dump body is composed of five components: the floor, the two sides, the front wall and the canopy. The dump body is manufactured at Caterpillar Mexico in Monterrey, Mexico, as well as at least to a limited degree by WesTech of Casper, Wyoming in the western United States and shipped in component form to the customer site where it is assembled and welded into a monolithic structure before being joined to the frame during final assembly.

The frame is created from nine individual metal castings manufactured by Harrison Steel Castings Co., in Attica, Indiana and by Amite Foundry and Machine, Inc., in Amite City, Louisiana. The smallest casting weighs 500 lb (230 kg) and the largest casting weighs 12,000 lb (5,400 kg). The rough castings are shipped to the Caterpillar Decatur, Illinois, assembly plant.

At Caterpillar's assembly plant in Decatur, Illinois, the frame is assembled and the powertrain is installed and tested.

The nine castings that compose the frame are machined to provide clean welding surfaces. The castings are placed in a jig, and are initially joined by human welders. The frame is moved to a second welding station for further welding by robots. The third and final welding stage is completed by human welders. To ensure quality, welds are tested using an ultrasonic flaw detector. In total, 275 lb (125 kg) of welding wire is used to join the individual castings into a monolithic frame.

After the frame assembly is completed, production workers attach hydraulic lines and electrical wiring to the frame before installing the engine and rear axle. The frame/powertrain assembly is tested and then partially disassembled to facilitate shipping from Caterpillar's Decatur, Illinois assembly plant to the customer site.

== Transportation ==
The engine, frame, axles and differential requires six to seven semi-trailer truck loads, the cab requires one semi-trailer load, the six tires require two semi-trailer loads and the dump body requires four semi-trailer loads. In total, one 797 requires 12 to 13 semi-trailer truck loads that originate at various manufacturing facilities and deliver to the customer site. If a 797 must be moved from one job site to another for any reason, it cannot be driven on public roads due to its exceptional size and weight. Moving a 797 requires dis-assembly, loading onto semi-trailer trucks, transport and re-assembly at the new location.

== Final assembly ==
Final assembly of the 797 is completed by Caterpillar field mechanics at or near the customer site. Before the dump body can be joined to the frame, the dump body components must be assembled and welded together by a dedicated team, requiring seven to ten days per dump body. Final assembly of one 797 requires a team of seven mechanics working in three shifts around the clock, for 20 days, in addition to the time required to assemble and weld the dump body.

== Cost ==
Although the price varies based on individual customer specifications, each 797 costs approximately US$5,000,000. Other prices have been listed at US$3,400,000.

== Service life ==
All major components of the 797 can be serviced or replaced during the useful life of the truck, except for the frame. The overall service life of the truck is therefore dependent upon the durability of the frame which Caterpillar estimates to have a twenty-year service life.

== Competition ==
The Liebherr T 282 B and Bucyrus MT6300AC, as well as Caterpillar's own 798AC, match the Caterpillar 797F's 400 short tons (363 t) payload capacity, but employ diesel/electric powertrains in contrast to the 797F's diesel-powered, mechanical powertrain. Both fall short of the BelAZ 75710's 500 short ton capacity, the largest of any haul truck in the world, which also employs a diesel/electric powertrain. Depending on customer requirements, lower payload capacity 360 short tons (327 t) products such as the Komatsu 960E-1 and Belaz 75600 may also place competitive pressure on sales of the 797F.

== Specifications chart ==
Caterpillar 797 Series Comparison Chart
	797	797B	797F
Introduction to Service	1999	2002	2008
Nominal Payload Capacity	360 short tons (327 t)	380 short tons (345 t)	400 short tons (363 t)
Engine Power	3,211 hp (2,394 kW) net	3,370 hp (2,513 kW) net (SAE J1349)	3,793 hp (2,828 kW) net (SAE J1349)
Engine Model	3524B High Displacement EUI	Cat 3524B High Displacement EUI	Cat C175-20 ACERT
Engine Arrangement	V-12 x 2	V-12 x 2	V-20
Top Speed (Loaded)	40 mph (64 km/h)	42 mph (68 km/h)	42 mph (68 km/h)
Gross Machine Operating Weight	1,230,000 lb (557,900 kg)	1,375,000 lb (623,700 kg)	1,375,000 lb (623,700 kg)
Overall Height to Top of ROPS (Empty)	23 ft 8 in (7.21 m)	24 ft 11 in (7.59 m)	24 ft 5 in (7.44 m)
Overall Height (Body Raised)	49 ft 3 in (15.01 m)	50 ft 2 in (15.29 m)	51 ft 6 in (15.70 m)
Overall Length	47 ft 7 in (14.50 m)	47 ft 5 in (14.45 m)	49 ft 6 in (15.09 m)
Overall Tire Width	30 ft 0 in (9.14 m)	32 ft 0 in (9.75 m)	31 ft 3 in (9.53 m)
Fuel Tank Refill Capacity	1,000 US gal (3,790 L)	1,800 US gal (6,810 L)	2,000 US gal (7,570 L)

== See also ==
- Haul truck
