= Caterpillar 789 =

Model of haul truck by Caterpillar Inc

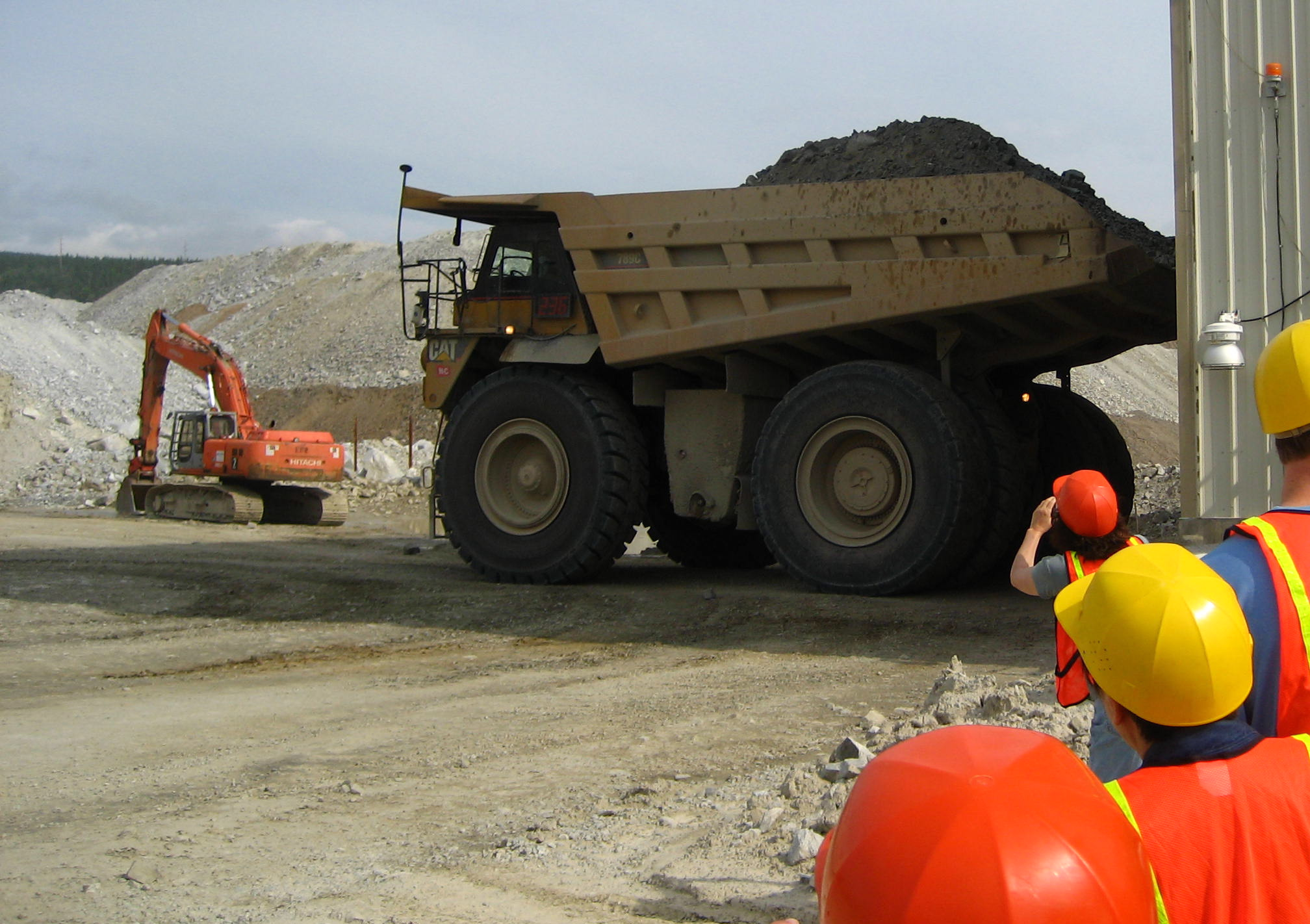
A Caterpillar 789 in an open pit mine.

The Caterpillar 789 dump truck is a model of haul trucks, typically used in open pit mining, manufactured by Caterpillar Inc. The 789 has a capacity of 177 tonnes, and its engine can produce 1770 horsepower. While some competing products use hybrid drive, the Caterpillar 789 has an entirely mechanical drive-train. The first Caterpillar 789 trucks were introduced in 1986.

The vehicle's controls are designed to work much like those of an ordinary truck. However, they have multiple mechanisms for the driver to slow or stop the vehicle. Next to the traditional brake pedal there is a second foot pedal to activate a secondary braking system. There is a lever to the right of the steering wheel, called the "retarding brake", used for less intense braking. Finally, the vehicle's drive-train will automatically change gears, while descending inclines, to help the driver keep its speed under control.

Because the vehicle provides the driver with a limited view, with many blind spots, they are equipped with multiple proximity sensors, and closed circuit TVs cameras.

The 789 averages 0.3 miles per US gallon (7.8 L/km). It has six tires, each of which are 12 feet (3.7 m) in diameter and cost $50,000 to replace.

Malcolm Nance, the author of Defeating ISIS: Who They Are, How They Fight, What They Believe, described ISIS suicide bombers driving Caterpillar 789 trucks loaded with explosives into fortifications.

== See also ==
● Caterpillar 797

● Caterpillar 740 Ejector

● Caterpillar 777
