= Tire manipulator =

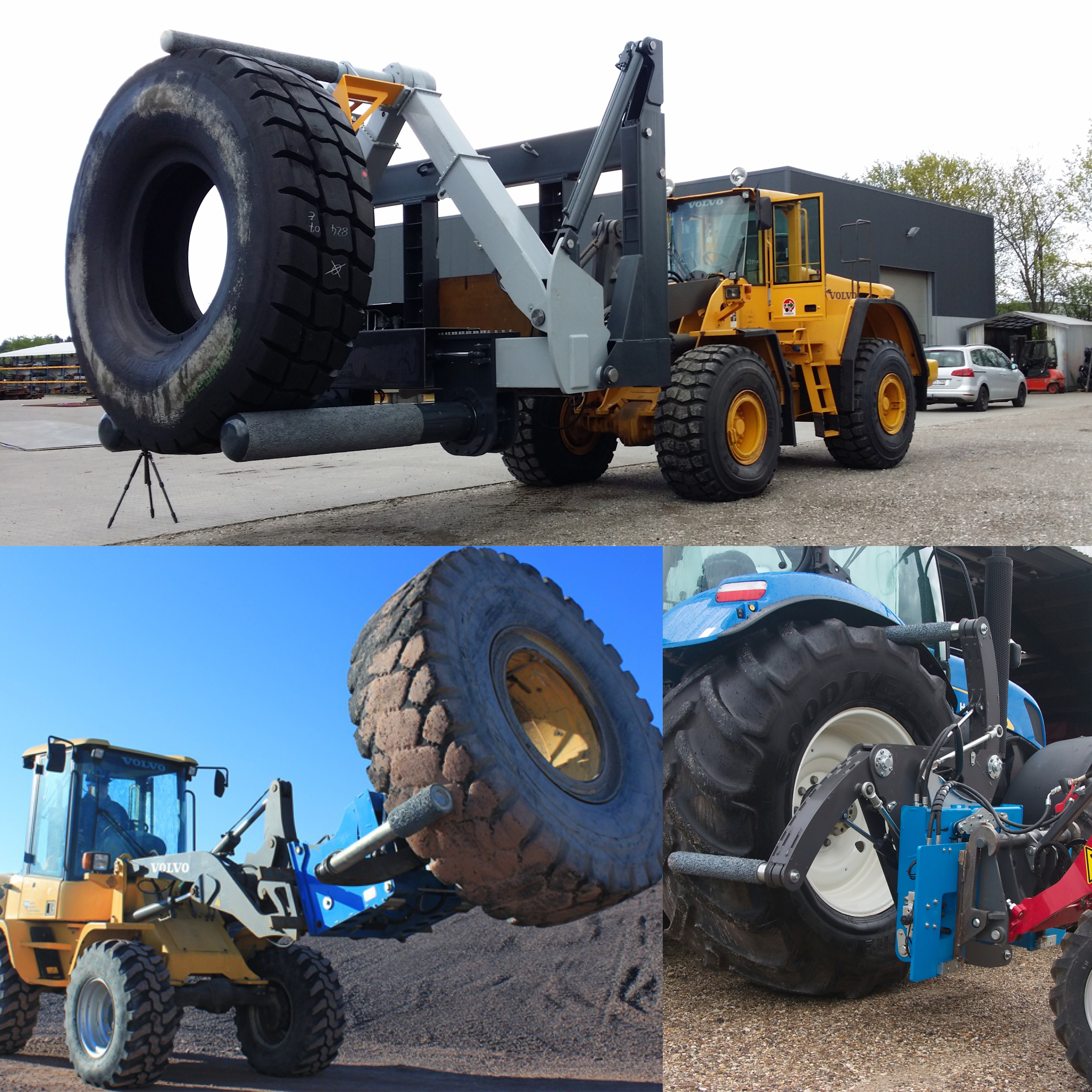
Comparison of Tire Manipulators

Tire Manipulator is a piece of equipment, or tool that is used for handling large OTR tires, or large wheels. Other names that are used for tire manipulator are tire handler or tire clamp. Tire manipulator is generally manufactured as an attachment which is a part of another vehicle. For example, a forklift, loader or another truck.

== Use ==
Tire manipulator is commonly developed and manufactured to customer specification because sizes of tires varies in every industry. In mining industry it is common to use tires with diameter over 3 meters. One of the biggest haulers in the world has tires with diameter of 4 meters. They can weigh over 2 000 kg. On the other hand, in agriculture tires are rarely greater than 2 meters, with weigh up to 1,000 kg.

Companies started to use tire manipulators mostly because of safety and effectiveness. In the past, many people were injured, or even killed by heavy tires exploding or falling. It was also time consuming to change tires. Mainly for these two reasons companies realised there is a need for special equipment that can handle large tires and service heavy wheels.

Nowadays, there are a number of tire manipulators in the market. Some of them are engineered to handle tires in agriculture, building industry, or material handling. You could find them under name Easy Gripper 2160, Tire Handler, Tire Manipulator, Giant Tire Handler, or Tire Clamp.
