= BelAZ =

Belarusian automobile manufacturer

Belarusian Automobile Plant (BelAZ)

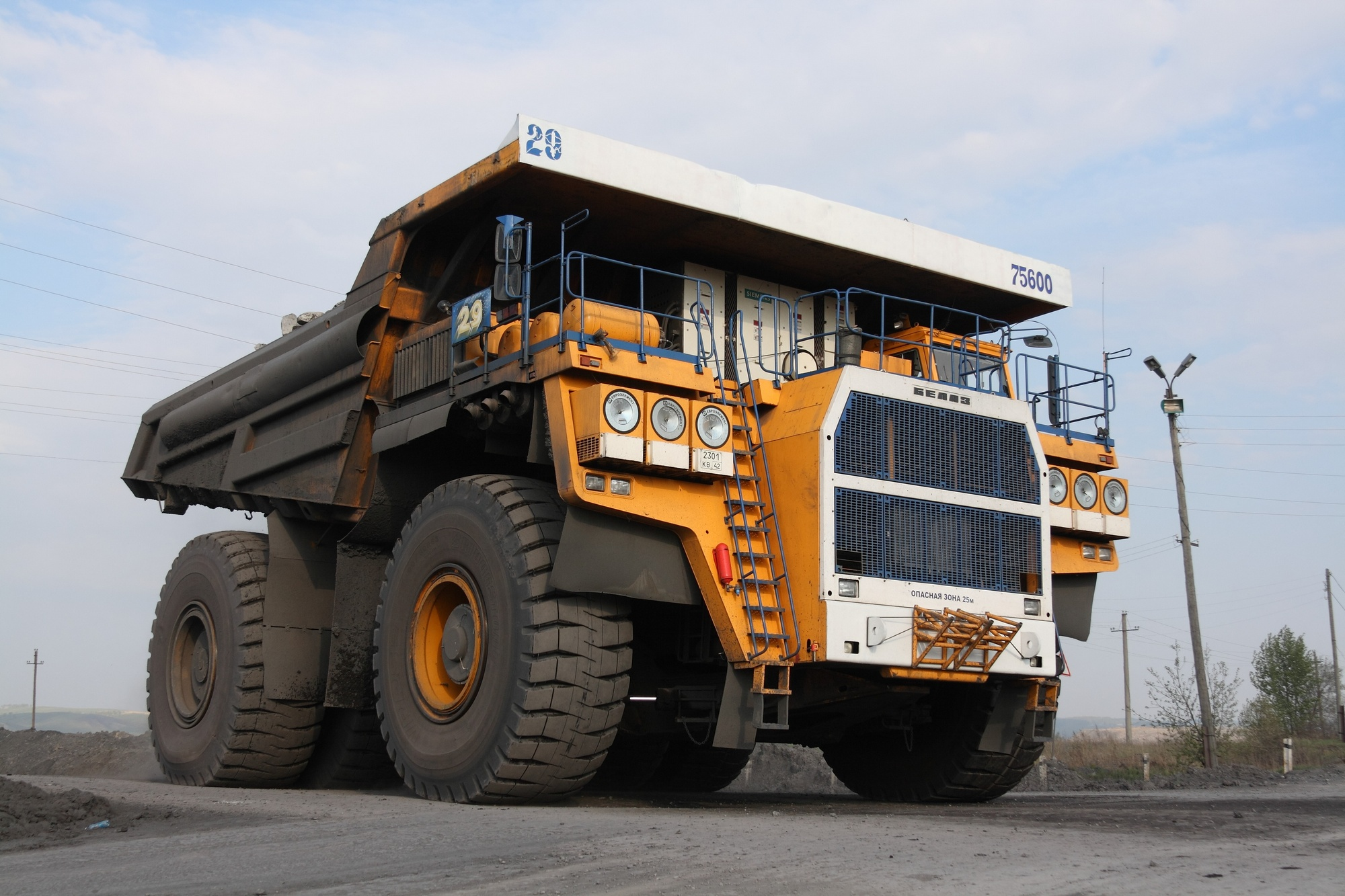
- BelAZ 75600
- Type: State owned enterprise
- Industry: Automotive
- Founded: 1948
- Headquarters: Žodzina, Belarus
- Area served: Worldwide
- Key people: Piotr Parkhomchyk
- Products: Dump trucks Haul trucks Heavy equipment Goods wagons
- Revenue: €800 million (2024)
- Operating income: €178 million (2018)
- Net income: €139 million (2018)
- Total assets: €306 million (2024)
- Owner: Government of Belarus
- Number of employees: 9927 (2016)
- Website: belaz.by

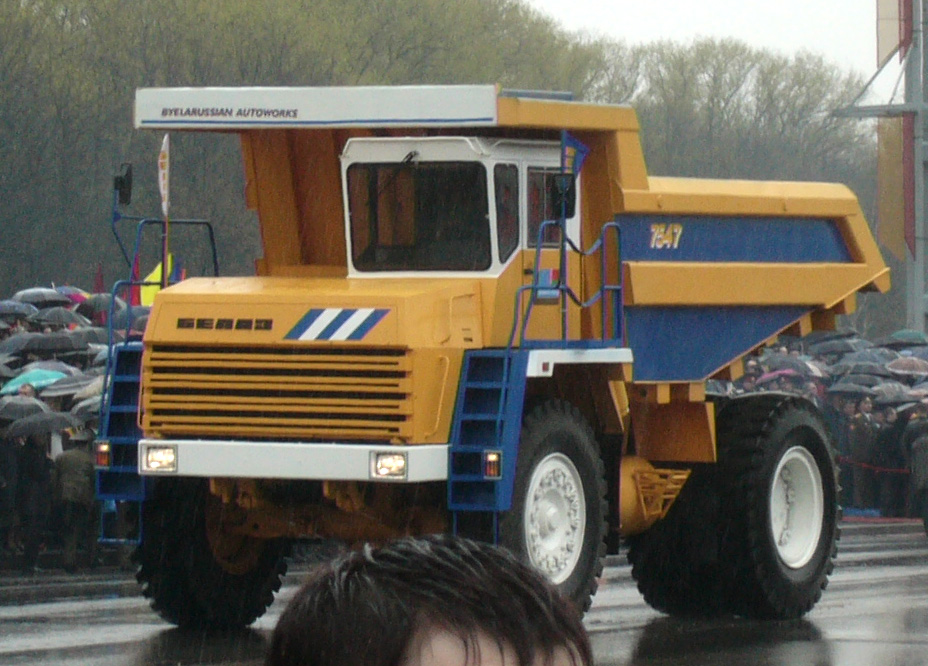
Mining dump truck BelAZ-7547

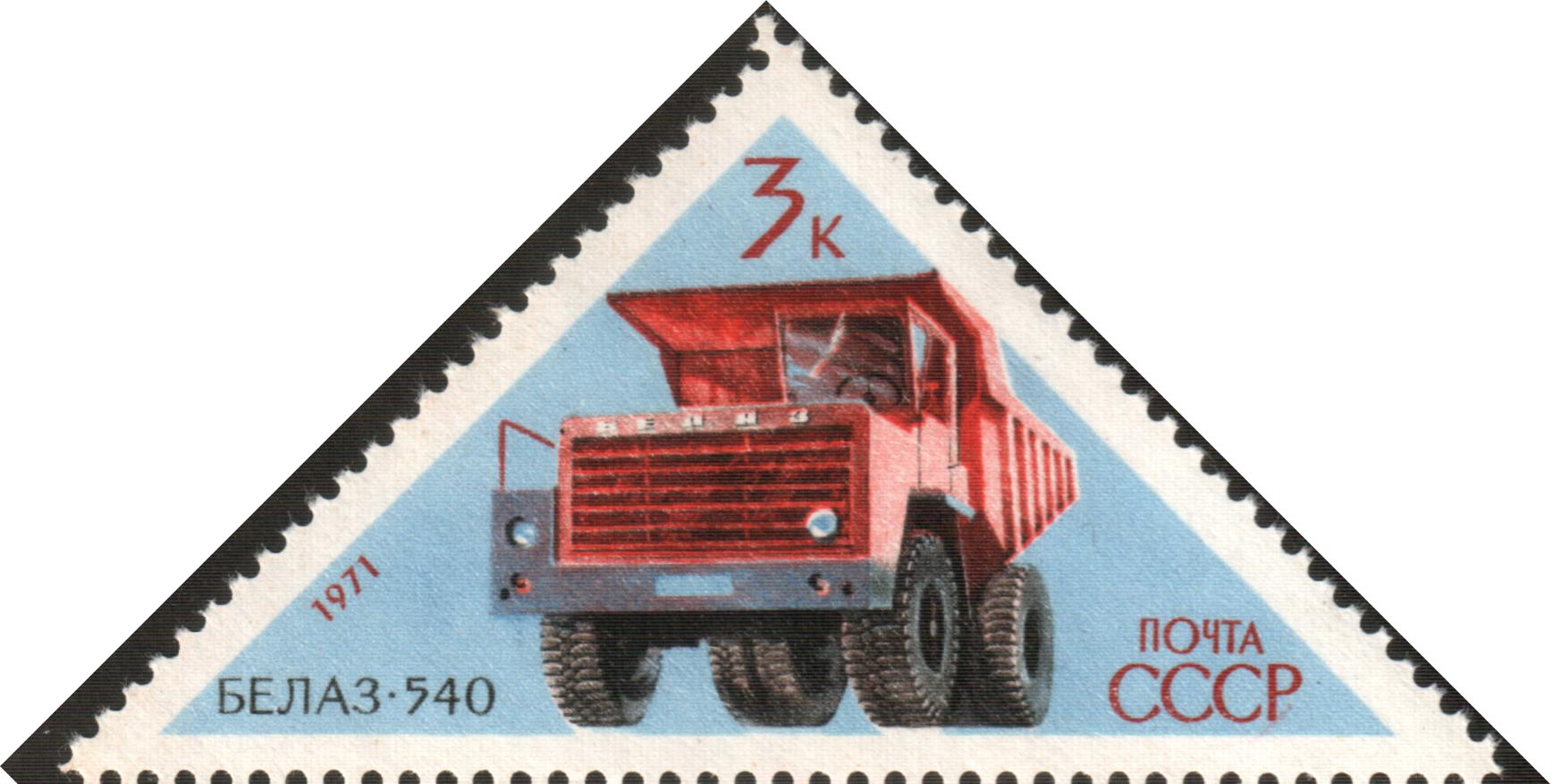
1971 USSR postage stamp depicting BelAZ 540

BelAZ (Belarusian: Беларускі аўтамабільны завод, romanized: Byelaruski autamabilny zavod, lit. 'Belarusian Automobile Plant', Russian: Белорусский автомобильный завод or БелАЗ, romanized: Belorusskiy avtomobilnyy zavod) is a Belarusian automobile plant and one of the world's largest manufacturers of especially large dump trucks, as well as other heavy transport equipment for the mining and construction industries.

BelAZ is a site for one of the largest Commonwealth of Independent States investment projects. The factory finalized two of the three scheduled phases of the technical re-equipment and upgrades. The Quality Management System applied in research and development, fabrication, erection and after-sale service of the equipment complies with international ISO 9000 standards.

== History ==
- In 1948, a peat extraction machinery plant was constructed by the railroad station Žodzina.
- In 1958 it was renamed into BelAZ. Initially it produced MAZ trucks.
- In 1961 the first 27-tonne BelAZ pit and quarry dump truck was manufactured.
- In 2006 the independent Mogilev Automobile Plant (MoAZ) was merged into BelAZ.
- In fall of 2006 the first delivery of BelAZ-75600.
- In April 2012, BelAZ announced it would hold an IPO – the first in Belarus.
- In September 2013, BelAZ presented the first sample of mining dump truck BelAZ-75710, the world largest dump truck with a load capacity of 450 tons.

=== Political repressions, international sanctions ===
On 21 June 2021, BelAZ was added to the sanctions list of the European Union for repressions against workers who participated in mass protests against the authoritarian regime of Alexander Lukashenka following the controversial presidential election of 2020. According to the official decision of the EU,

"[BelAZ] is a source of significant revenue for the Lukashenka regime. Lukashenka stated that the government will always support the company, and described it as “Belarusian brand” and “part of the national legacy”. OJSC BelAZ has offered its premises and equipment to stage a political rally in support of the regime. Therefore OJSC “Belaz” benefits from and supports the Lukashenka regime."

Moreover,

"the employees of OJSC “Belaz” who took part in strikes and peaceful protests in the aftermath of the fraudulent August 2020 elections in Belarus were threatened with layoffs and intimidated by the company management. A group of employees was locked indoors by OJSC Belaz to prevent them from joining the other protesters. The company management presented a strike to the media as a staff meeting. Therefore OJSC “Belaz” is responsible for the repression of civil society and supports the Lukashenka regime."

On the same day, BelAZ was also sanctioned by Canada. Later, Switzerland also sanctioned the company.

On 30 June 2021, Rolls-Royce Holdings ended its cooperation with BelAZ as a result of EU sanctions, in September 2021 Cummins joined the ban.

According to a joint journalistic investigation by Organized Crime and Corruption Reporting Project, Belarusian Investigative Center and Siena, after BelAZ was blacklisted by the European Union, a Belarusian company controlled by a citizen of Lithuania was used for shipping BelAZ trucks to Chile via the Lithuanian port of Klaipėda.

In March 2023, the U.S. Treasury included BelAZ and its CEO Sergei Nikiforovich in the Specially Designated Nationals and Blocked Persons (SDN) List. In May 2023, Ukraine also imposed sanctions against BelAZ.

== Models ==
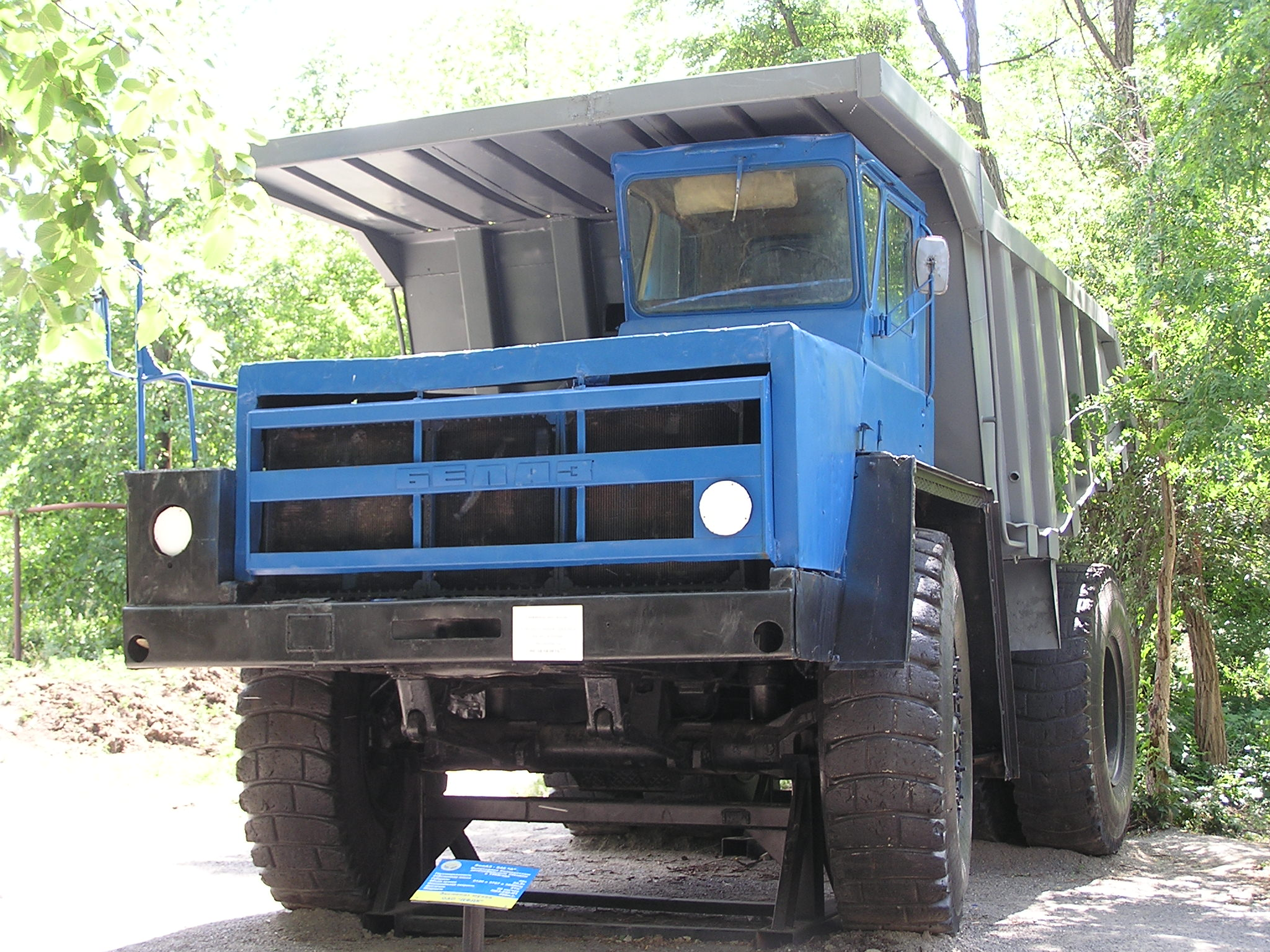
BelAZ-548A (1967)

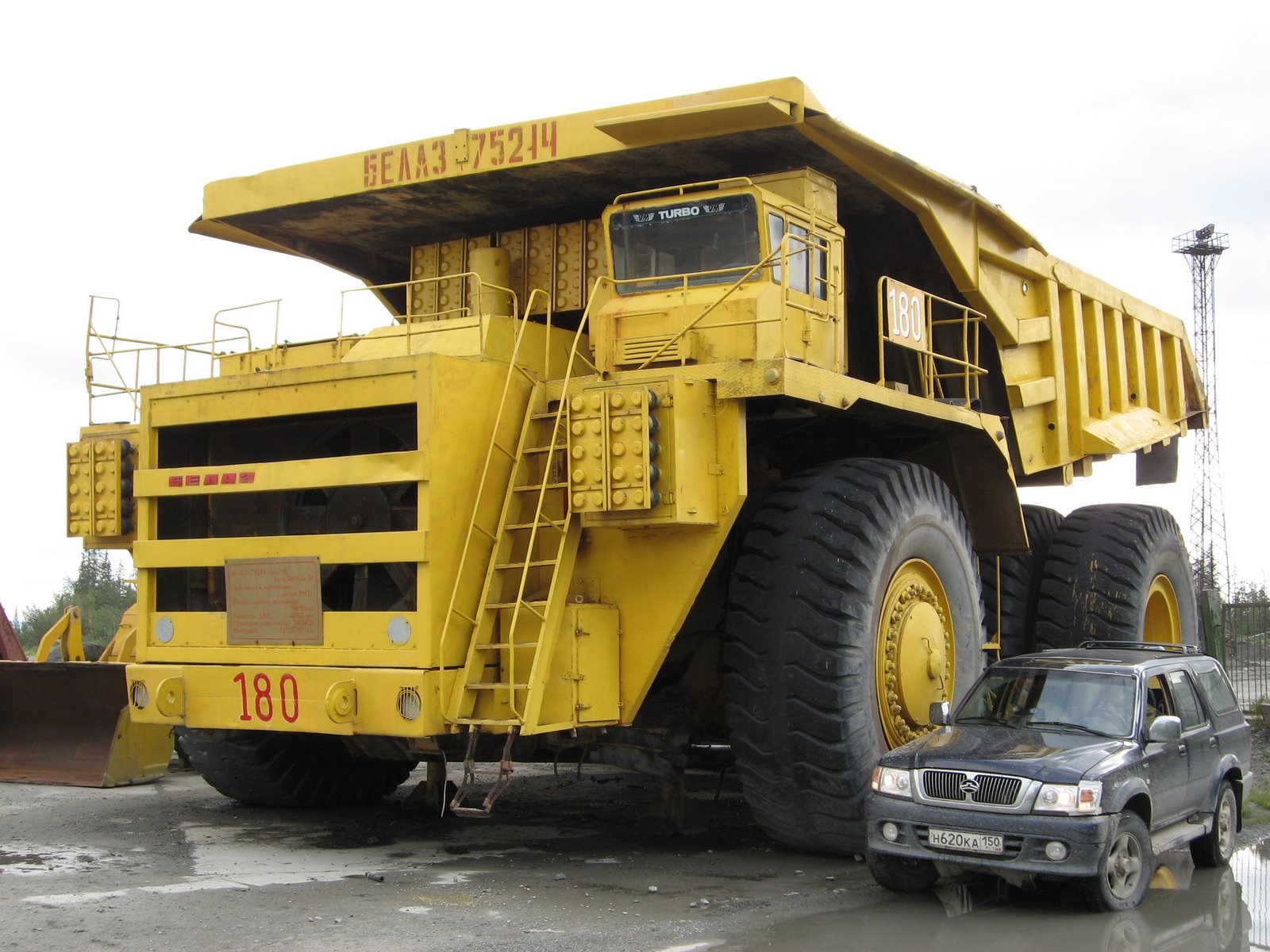
BelAZ-75214

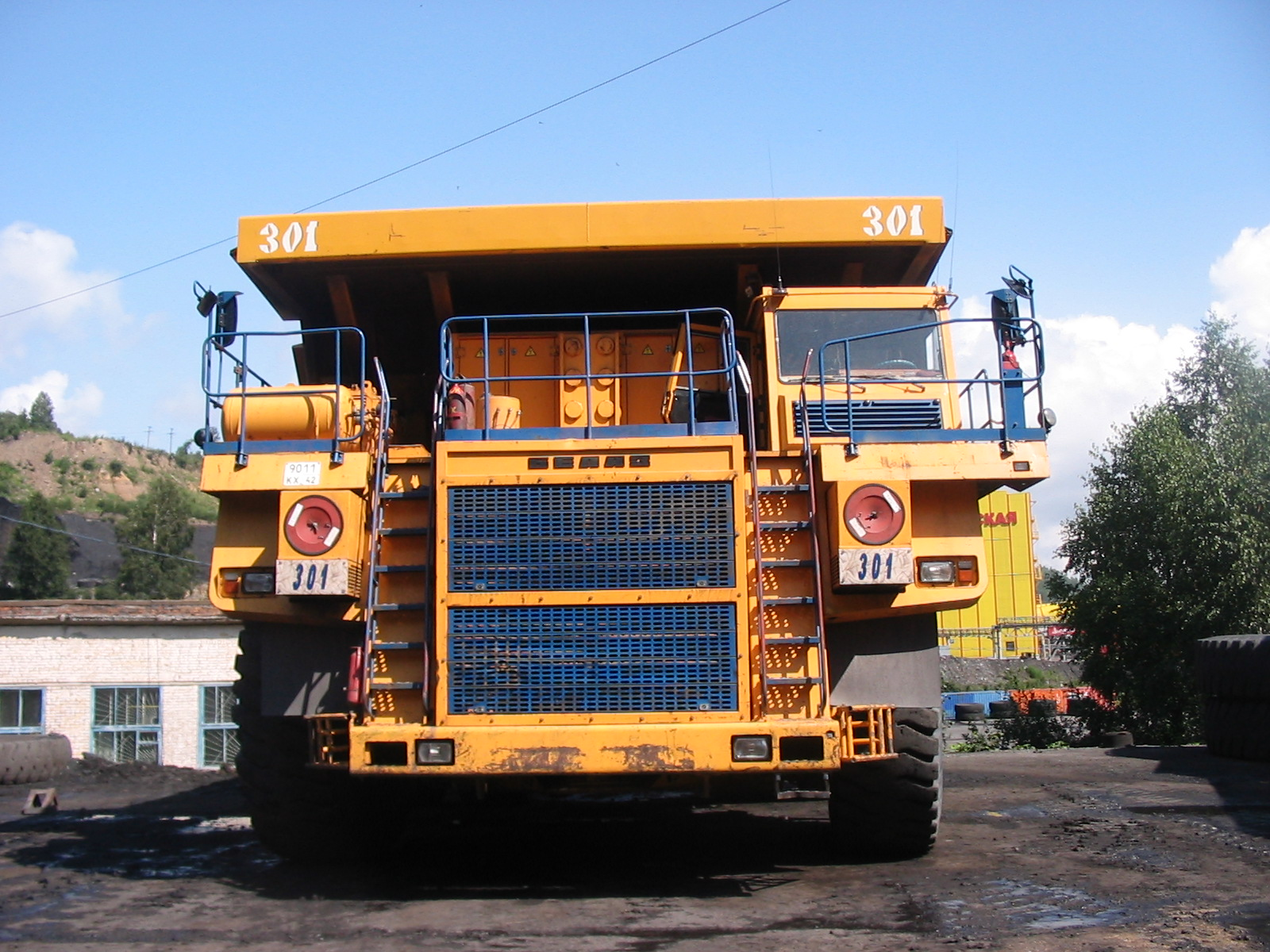
BelAZ-7513

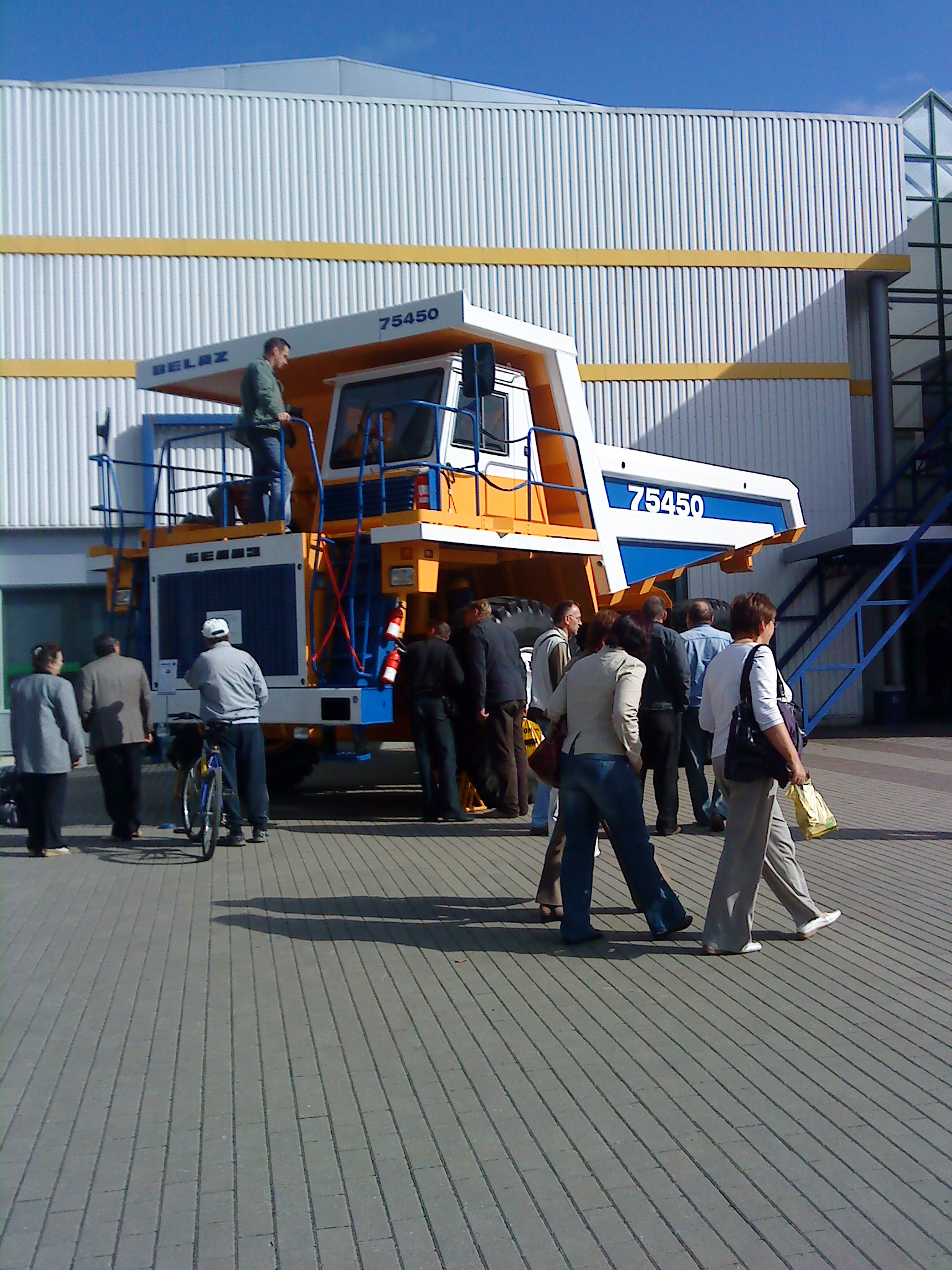
BelAZ-75450

=== Discontinued models ===
==== Mining dump trucks ====
- MAZ-525, 25 t (1958–1965)
- BelAZ-540, 27 t (1965)
- BelAZ-540A
- BelAZ-540B, 45 t
- BelAZ-548A, 40 t (1967)
- BelAZ-548B, 65 t
- BelAZ-549, 75–80 t (1969)
- BelAZ-7519, 110–120 t (1977)
- BelAZ-7521, 180 t (1979)
- BelAZ-75211, 170–220 t (1983)
- BelAZ-75214
- BelAZ-7522
- BelAZ-75303
- BelAZ-75483

=== Current model range ===
==== Mining dump trucks ====
- BelAZ-7540, 30 t
- **BelAZ-7545**, 45 t
- BelAZ-7547, 42–45 t
- BelAZ-7555, 55–60 t (since 1994)
- **BelAZ-7557**, 90 t
- BelAZ-7513, 110–130 t (since 1996)
- **BelAZ-7517**, 154–160 t
- BelAZ-7530, 180–220 t
- **BelAZ-7531**, 240 t
- **BelAZ-7560**, 320–360 t
- BelAZ-7558, 90 t
- **BelAZ-7571**, 450 t (since 2013)

Note: New models are highlighted in bold.

==== Construction & road-building vehicles ====
- MoAZ-4048, front-end loader, 7.5 t
- BelAZ-7822, front-end loader, 7 t
- BelAZ-7823, Wheel dozer
- Belaz 78221 Wheel loader
- MoAZ-60148, scraper
- MoAZ-60007, scraper
- Concrete mixer trucks

==== Other vehicles ====
- MoAZ-75296, low-profile mining and tunneling concrete mixer truck
- BelAZ-74212, aircraft tug

==== Other products ====
- Articulated haulers
- Underground vehicles
- Vehicles for mine-servicing works
- Vehicles for metallurgical works
- Goods wagons: covered hoppers, open wagons, flat wagons

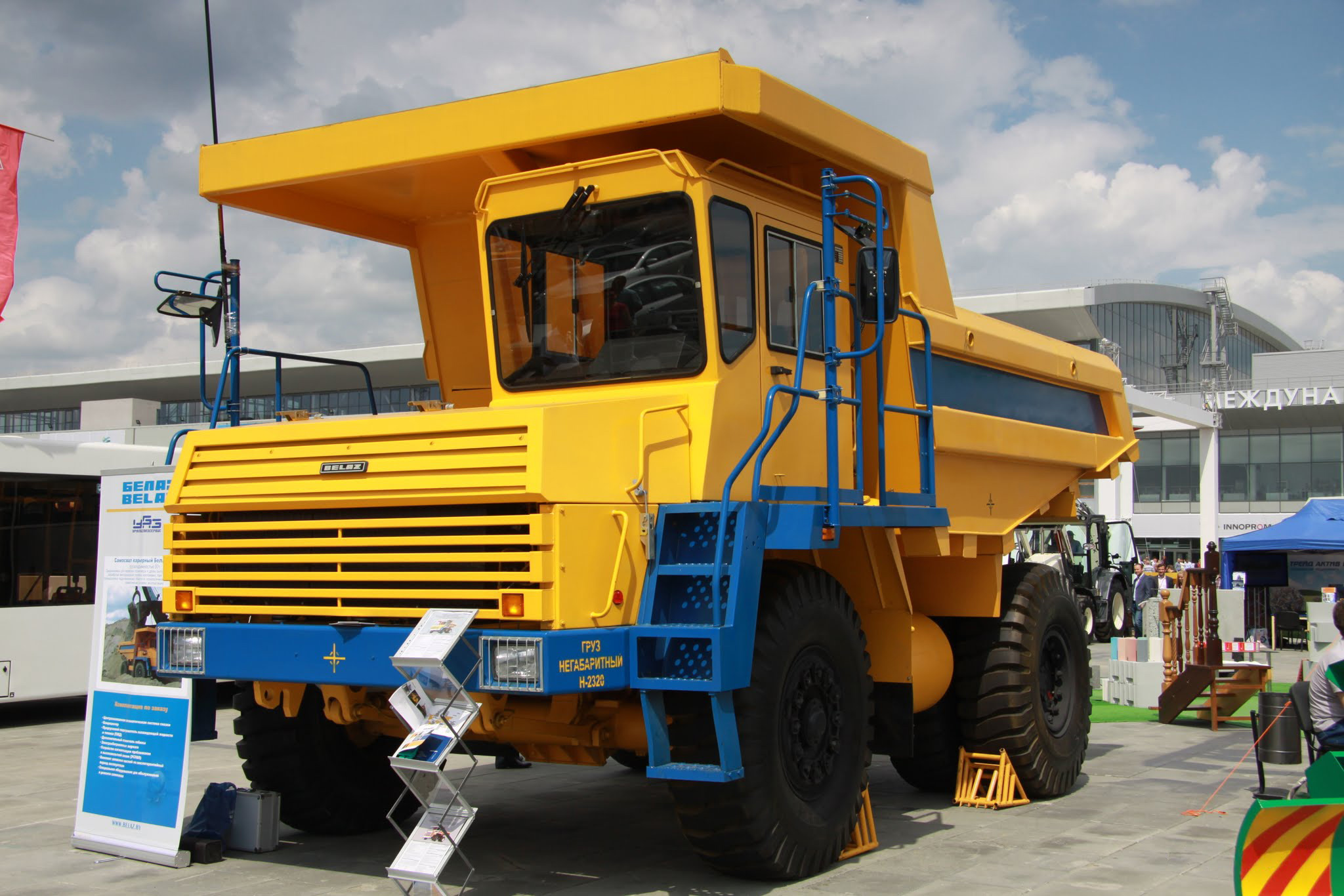
BelAZ-7540

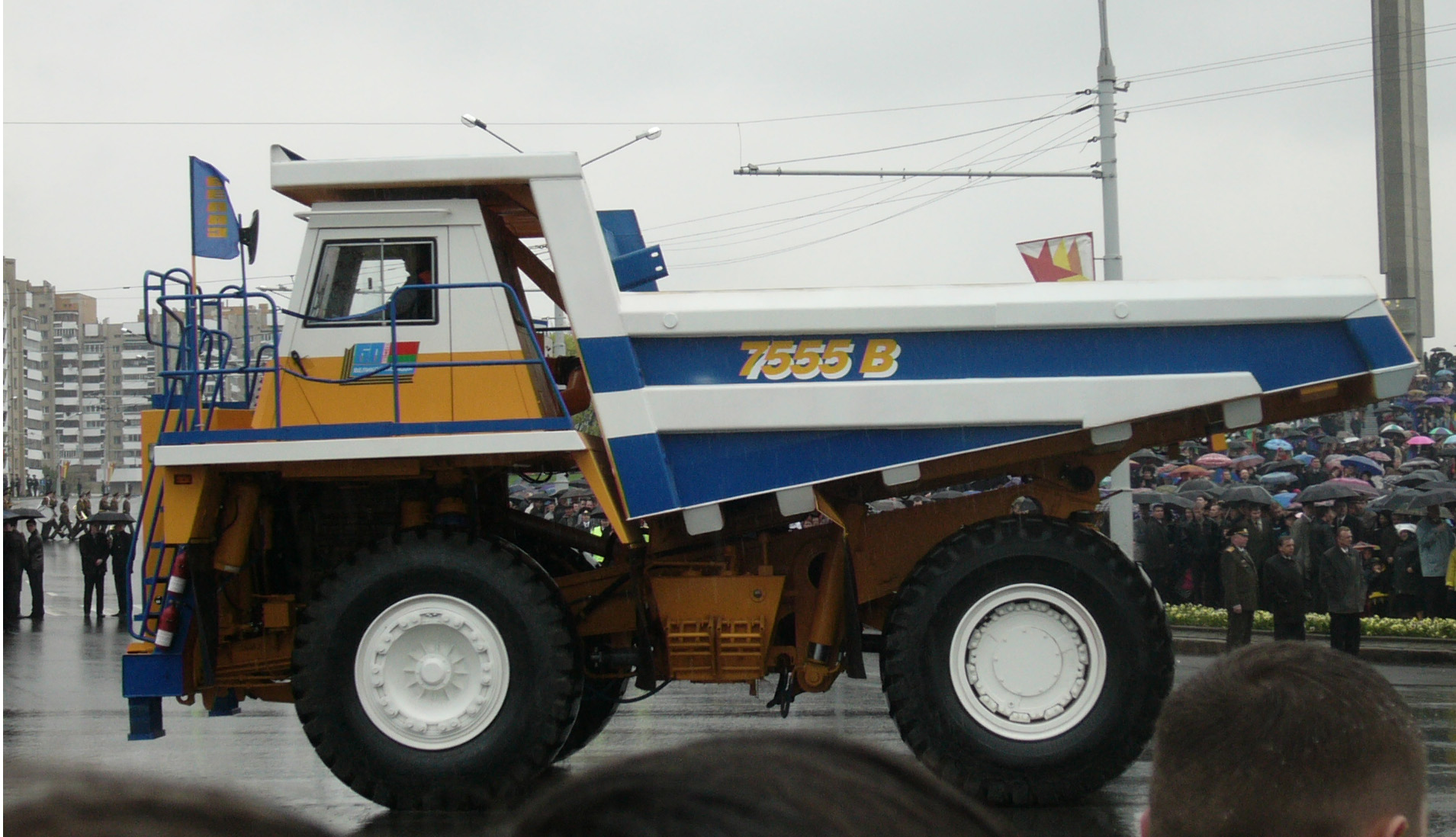
BelAZ-7555

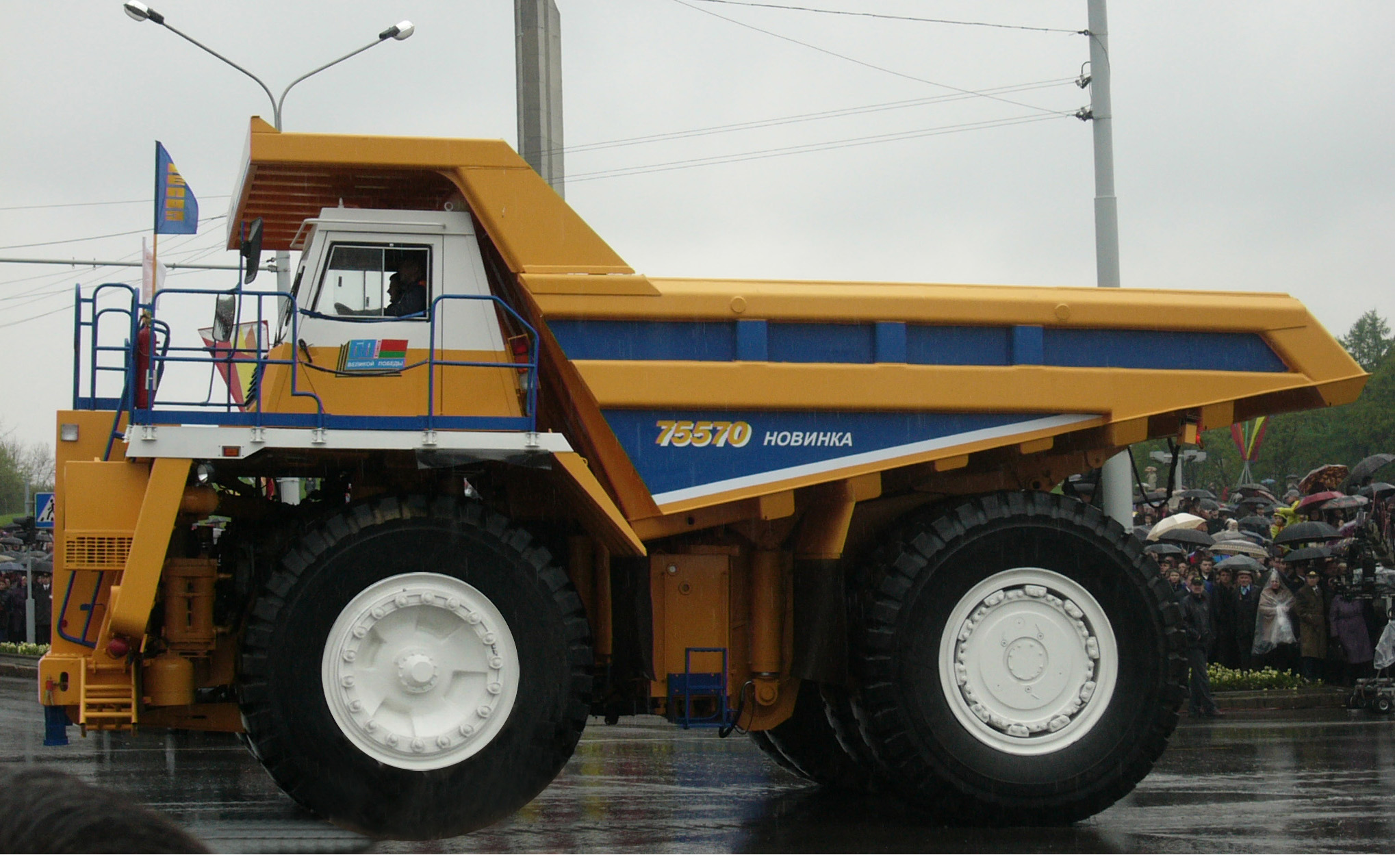
BelAZ-75570

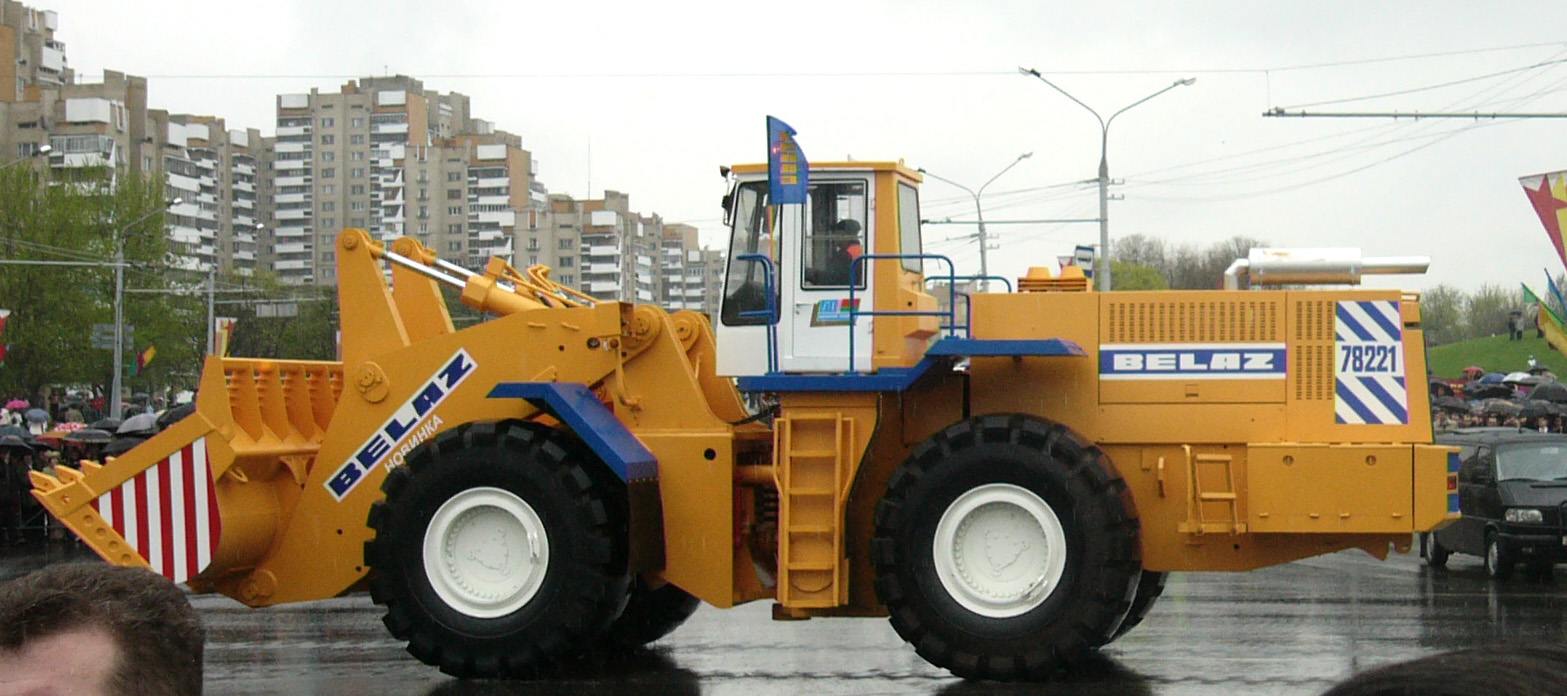
Front-end loader BelAZ-78221

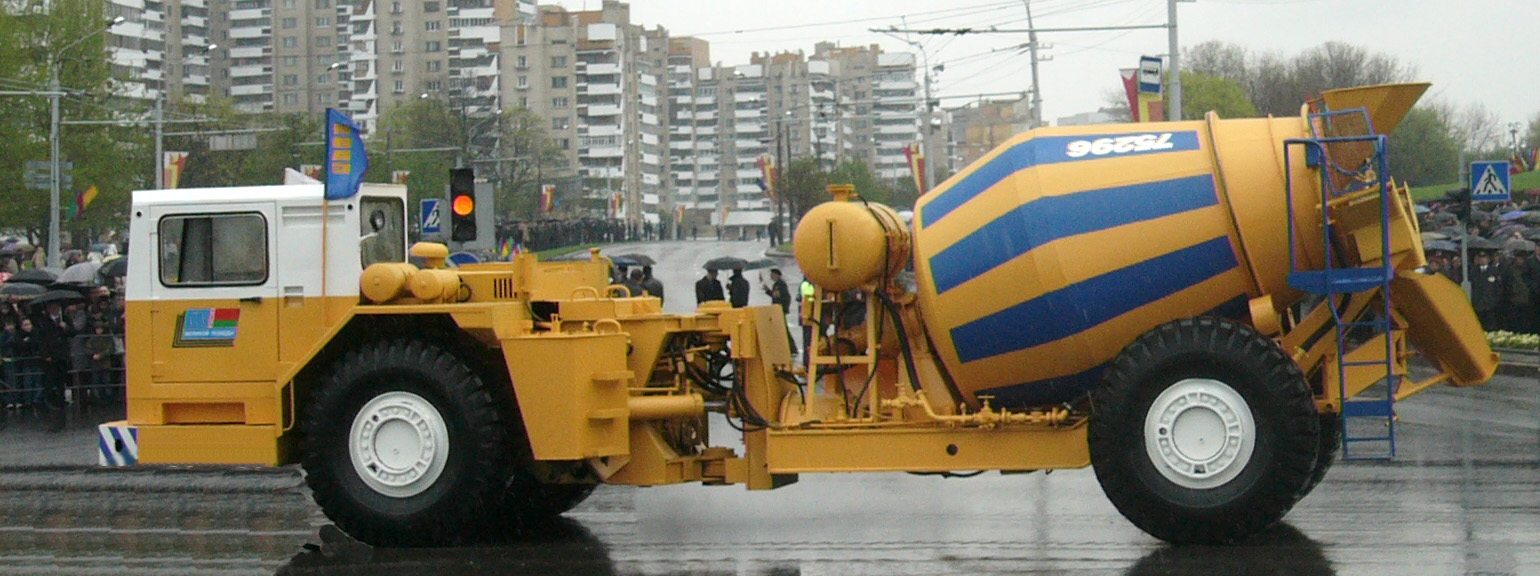
Concrete mixer truck MoAZ-75296

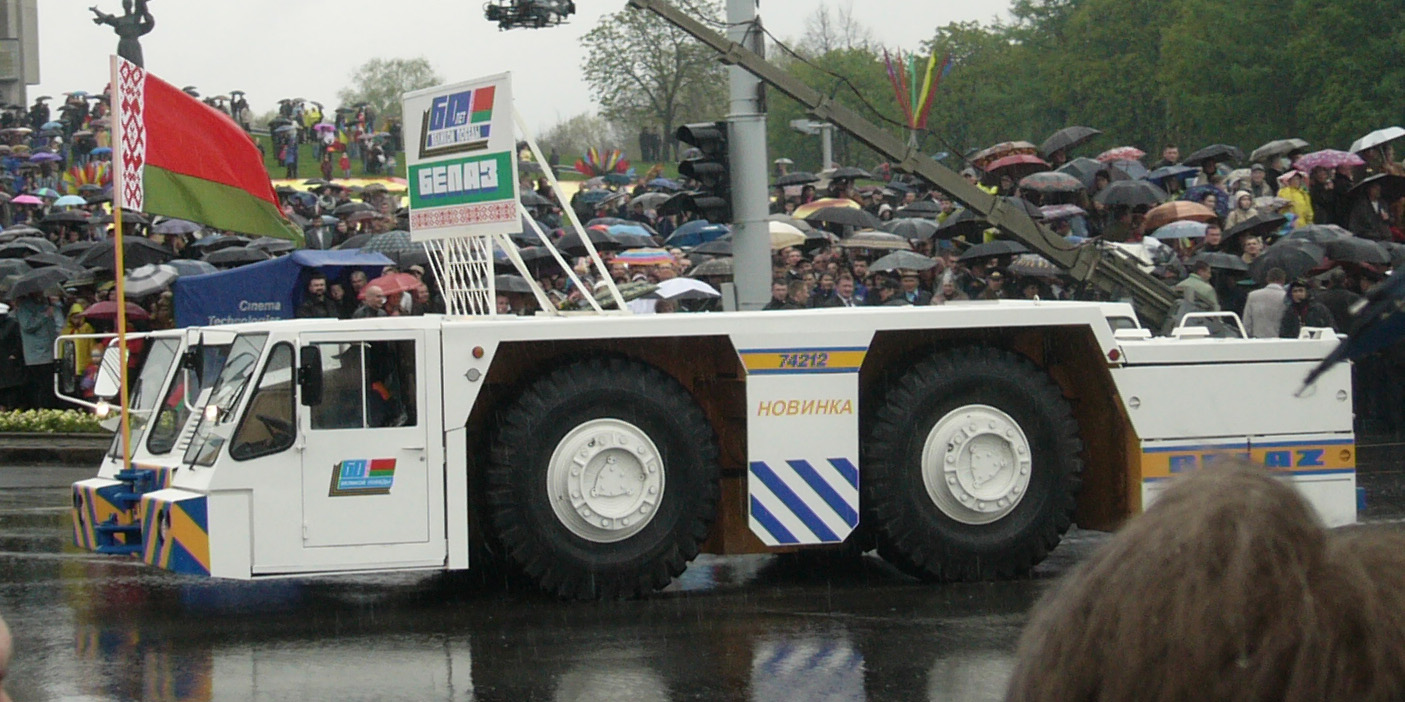
Aircraft tug BelAZ-74212

== Sponsorship in football ==
- FC Torpedo-BelAZ Zhodino

== See also ==
- BelAZ-75600 - off-highway, ultra class haul trucks
- BelAZ-75710 - the world's largest and heaviest dump truck.
