= Haul road =

A haul road (also haulage road or haul track) is a term for roads designed for heavy or bulk transfer of materials by haul trucks in the mining industry. It is also used for freight-only roads in other contexts, for example in South Boston leading to Conley Terminal.

The term is used in the mining industry and can refer to roads that are inside mining operations, such as open-cut and surface mines.

It can also be used for roads between mining operations and processing locations.

Type of truck also governs road design and construction - articulated or rear dump.

Determinations as the effectiveness or practicality of haul roads in mining management can include:

- number of lanes
- road width
- road slope
- road subbase material
- geometry of curves of road

Determination of the haul trucks gross vehicle weights can also determine stopping distances and road design.
