= BelAZ 75600 =

BelAZ 7560
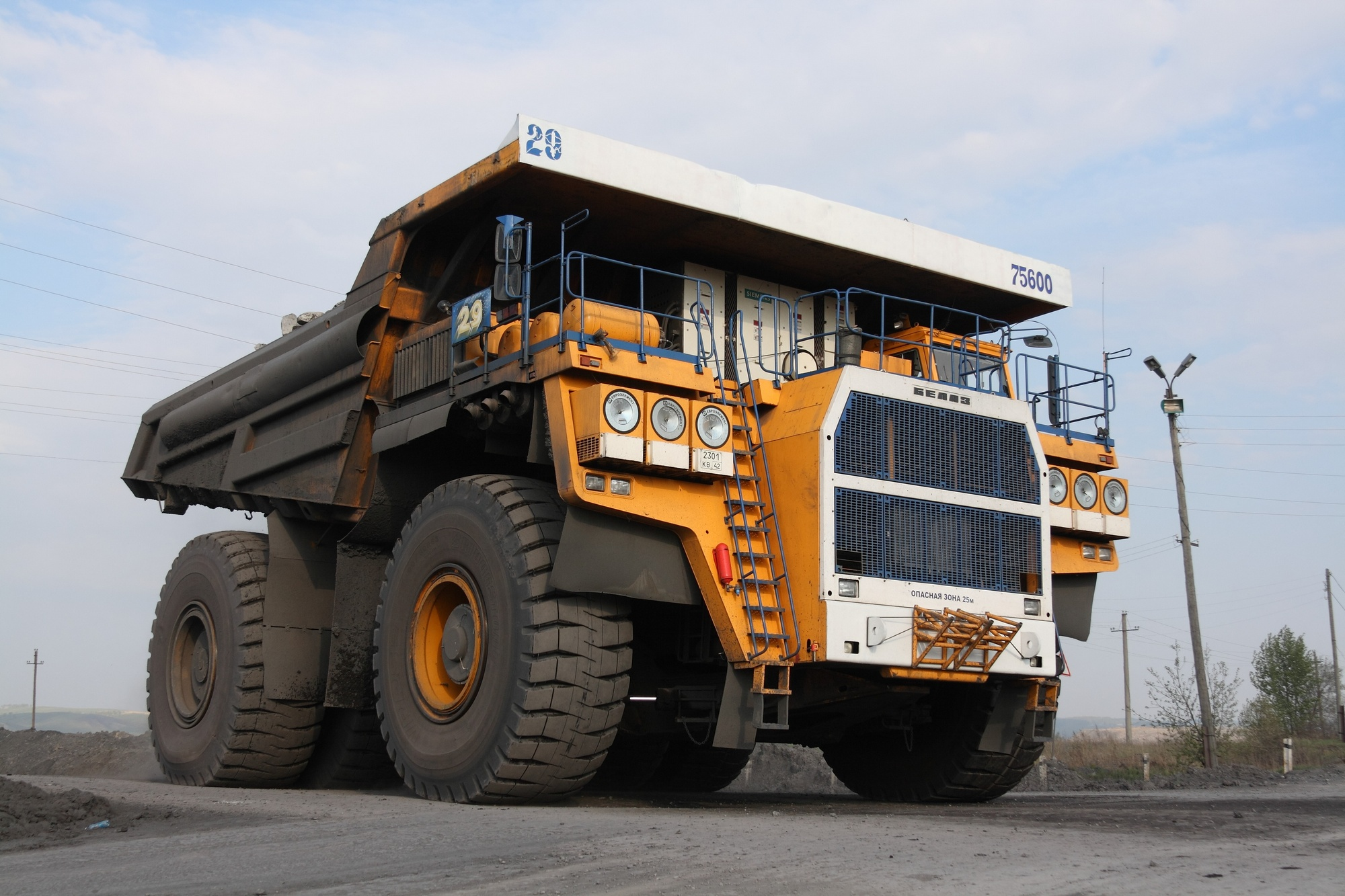

Body and chassis
- Class: Ultra class

Powertrain
- Engine: Cummins QSK78 or MTU 20V4000
- Power output: 2,610 kW or 2,800 kW
- Transmission: AC Electric

Dimensions
- Length: 14.9 metres (48.88 ft)
- Width: 9.25 metres (30.35 ft)
- Height: 7.22 metres (23.69 ft)
- Curb weight: 240 tonnes (260 short tons)
- Max. weight loaded: 560 tonnes (620 short tons)
- Max. payload: 320 tonnes (350 short tons)
- Max. torque: 13,771 N⋅m (10,157 ft⋅lb) @ 1500 RPM
- Max. speed: 64 km/h (40 mph)
- Bed volume: 139 m^{3} (182 cu yd) struck 199 m^{3} (260 cu yd) heaped

The BelAZ 75600 is a series of off-highway, ultra class haul trucks developed and manufactured in Belarus by OJSC "Belarusian Autoworks" specifically for transportation of loosened rocks on technological haul roads at open-pit mining sites worldwide under different climatic conditions.

The trucks have a diesel-electric transmission. Engines are Cummins QSK78 (model 75600) or MTU 20V4000 (model 75601) generating 2610 or 2800 kW respectively.

== See also ==
- BelAZ
- BelAZ 75710

== Link ==
- Official Website
