= International Harvester Payhauler =

Payhauler 350

Overview
- Manufacturer: International Harvester; Payhauler Corp. Terex Corp.
- Production: 1956-1982 (IHC); 1982-1998 (Payhauler); 1998-2003 (Terex)

Body and chassis
- Class: 50-ton (45t)
- Body style: Dump truck
- Layout: front engine 4x4
- Related: Payhauler, 140, 180, 330

Powertrain
- Engine: Cummins KT28 V12 turbocharged and aftercooled diesel
- Transmission: 6 speed powershift

Dimensions
- Length: 30 ft 3 in (9.2 m)
- Width: 13 ft 3 in (4.0 m)
- Height: 13 ft 4 in (4.1 m)
- Curb weight: 36 tons (33t) (empty); 86 tons (78t) (loaded)

The Payhauler is a series of dump trucks that were produced from 1956 to 2003. Introduced by International Harvester as the International Harvester Payhauler, the line was spun off in 1982 into a separate company, the Payhauler Corporation.

== History ==
In 1956, the International Harvester company introduced the Payhauler line of heavy duty off-highway rear-dump trucks, initially available as a 25-ton (23t) capacity rear-wheel-drive model. Unlike other haul trucks it had dual tires on the front (steering) axle and carried the load with the same weight on both axles. Early models had a Detroit Diesel 16V71 engine; later Cummins engines were used.

In 1964, the Payhauler 180 entered service. The 45-ton (43t) truck became the first large, all-wheel-drive end-dump truck in the market.

In 1973, the original rear-drive model trucks were discontinued, and the all-wheel-drive truck models were designated the Payhauler 330 and 350 for their 45-ton (43t) and 50-ton (45t) trucks respectively.

=== Ownership changes ===
In 1982, International Harvester sold the Payhauler line to employees who formed the Payhauler Corporation to continue manufacture of the Payhauler 350. Payhauler would later be acquired by Terex in 1998.

During both ownership changes, the Payhauler 350 continued to be produced with the paint scheme being the only apparent change made to the truck up until the line was discontinued in 2003.
