= Komatsu 960E-1 =

Off-highway ultra class haul truck for mining and heavy-duty construction

Overview
- Manufacturer: Komatsu
- Production: Since 2008
- Assembly: Peoria, IL, USA

Body and chassis
- Class: Ultra class
- Body style: Dump truck
- Layout: Front engine, rear wheel drive

Powertrain
- Engine: Komatsu SSDA18V170; Arrangement: V18; Power: 3,500 horsepower (2.6 MW)
- Transmission: GE GTA-39 alternator with (2) GE GDY108 induction traction motors

Dimensions
- Wheelbase: 21 ft 10 in (6.65 m)
- Length: 51 ft 2 in (15.60 m)
- Width: 30 ft 2 in (9.19 m)
- Height: 24 ft 2 in (7.37 m)
- Curb weight: Max Loaded 1,270,000 pounds (580 t)

The Komatsu 960E-1 (960E) is an off-highway, ultra-class, rigid-frame, two-axle, diesel/AC electric powertrain haul truck designed and manufactured by Komatsu in Peoria, Illinois, United States. The 960E-1 has been Komatsu's largest, highest capacity haul truck, offering a payload capacity of up to 360 short tons (327 t). The 960-E1 is the first generation of the 960E series of haul trucks and is alternately referred to by Komatsu specifically as the 960E-1 or generally as the 960E.

The 960E-1 was supplanted by the 980E-4 as the Komatsu's highest capacity haul truck in September 2016, with a haul capacity of 400 short tons (363 t).

== Public debut ==
Komatsu America Corp. announced the introduction of the 960E-1 on May 27, 2008.

== Powertrain ==
The 960E-1 is powered by a diesel/AC electric powertrain. A 3,500 horsepower (2,600 kW) Komatsu SSDA18V170 V18, dual-stage turbocharged diesel engine developed by Industrial Power Alliance, a joint venture between Komatsu and Cummins, is coupled to a General Electric GTA-39 insulated-gate bipolar transistor alternator that sends electrical power to twin General Electric GDY108 induction traction motors, with one induction motor located on each side of the rear axle.

== Assembly ==
The 960E-1 is assembled at Komatsu North America's Peoria Manufacturing Operation in Peoria, IL, USA.

== Transportation ==
Due to its exceptional size and weight, the 960E-1 can not be driven on public roads. The 960E-1 is shipped in component form to the customer site before undergoing final assembly.

== Specifications ==
At its introduction the 960E-1 was Komatsu's largest, highest payload capacity haul truck, offering a payload capacity of up to 360 short tons (327 t). The 960E-1 is 51 ft 2 in (15.60 m) long, 30 ft 2 in (9.19 m) wide and 24 ft 2 in (7.37 m) tall. Fully loaded the 960E-1 weighs 1,270,000 pounds (580 t) and can achieve a top speed of 40 mph (64 km/h)

== Competition ==
The 960E-1 competes with other 360 short tons (327 t) payload capacity haul trucks such as the Bucyrus MT5500AC.

== See also ==
- Haul truck
