= Liebherr T 282 series =

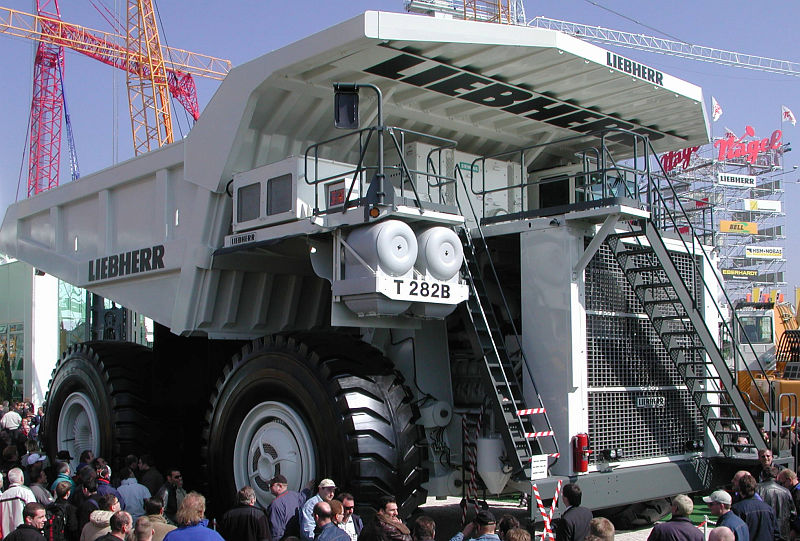
- Liebherr T 282B mining truck

Overview
- Manufacturer: Liebherr Mining Equipment Co.
- Production: 2004–2018
- Assembly: Newport News, VA, USA

Body and chassis
- Class: Ultra class
- Body style: Dump truck
- Layout: Front engine, rear wheel drive

Powertrain
- Engine: DDC/MTU 20V4000; Arrangement: V20; Displacement: 90 L (5,500 cu in); Power: 2,720 kW (3,650 hp); OR; Cummins QSK 78; Arrangement: V18; Displacement: 78 L (4,800 cu in); Power: 2,600 kW (3,500 hp)
- Transmission: AC electric

Dimensions
- Wheelbase: 6.55 m (21.5 ft)
- Length: 14.5 m (48 ft)
- Width: 8.7 m (29 ft)
- Height: 7.4 m (24 ft)
- Curb weight: GVW 237 t (261 short tons)

Chronology
- Successor: T 284

The Liebherr T 282 series are off-highway, ultra class, rigid frame, two axle, diesel-electric, AC powertrain haul trucks designed and manufactured in the United States by Liebherr Mining Equipment Co.

The Liebherr T 282 series is no longer in production, however, due to the extended service life of this equipment, many are still in operation on mines around the world. The T 282 series is succeeded by the Liebherr T 284.

== T 282 ==
The 1998 T 282 offers a payload of up to 330 t (360 short tons) and was built specifically for high-production mining applications worldwide. The T 282 was succeeded by the T 282 B, designed in Newport News, Virginia with a 360 t (400 short tons) payload capacity.

=== Development and testing ===
Liebherr developed a 330 t (360 short tons) payload capacity haul truck for large-scale mining operations.

Engineers at Liebherr Mining Equipment Newport News Co. designed the T 282 to have the lightest Empty Vehicle Weight (EVW) respective to its payload capacity. The T 282 was the first mining haul truck designed by Liebherr following the company's acquisition of existing haul truck manufacturing company, WISEDA, LTD.

The first T 282s were tested extensively at Liebherr's proving grounds.

=== Features ===
The T 282 standard features included air suspension seats, double shell concept for safety, thermal and acoustical isolation, emergency engine shutdown, environmentally controlled cab, safety glass with tinted windshield, cast steel components in stress areas, double a-frame front suspension system with inclined king pin, back up warning alarm, and more.

Optional features included L&M radiator, monitoring systems, special paint, cold climate kit, AM/FM radio with cassette player, electric starter, engine heater, canopy spill guards, body liner, and more.

==== Engine ====
The T 282 is powered by an electric drive system.

=== Manufacturing and assembly ===
No longer in production, the T 282 B was assembled at the Liebherr Mining Equipment Co. production facility in Newport News, Virginia.

The chassis (frame, axle box, engine, radiator, fan, and alternator) are assembled for shipment alongside the superstructure (operators' cabin, grid box, and drive system). All other components are implemented on-site with the customer.

== T 282 B ==
The 2004 Liebherr T 282 B offers a payload of up to 360 t (400 short tons) and was built specifically for high-production mining applications worldwide. The T 282 B succeeds the T 282.

=== Development and testing ===
In October 2003, Liebherr introduced the T 282 B haul truck for large-scale mining operations to reduce cost and increase productivity. The large dump body allowed for each T 282 B operating to carry more material per haul, with fewer trips from loading tool to fill pile.

Engineers at Liebherr Mining Equipment Newport News Co. designed the truck to have the largest haul truck payload capacity in the world at the time of release; with one of the lightest Empty Vehicle Weight (EVW) at 237 t (261 short tons), making for a highly productive truck with a relatively low operating cost. The T 282 B requires fewer operating hours to achieve the same level of production as trucks produced by other companies. The low EVW was achievable due to the lightweight AC drive system, use of less heavy components, and "stress flow" design, which allowed for lighter steel structures and casings, which in turn yield a lighter and stronger frame.

The first T 282 Bs were tested extensively at Liebherr's proving grounds.

=== Public debut ===
Liebherr introduced the T 282 B at the Bauma trade fair in Munich, Germany, on March 29, 2004. The T 282 B is the successor to the T 282, designed in Newport News, a 360 short tons (327 t) payload capacity, 2,000 kW (2,700 hp) diesel/AC electric drive haul truck introduced in 1998. At the time of its launch in 2004, the T 282 B offered the largest haul truck payload capacity in the world, and remained unmatched in payload capacity for over four years.

=== Features ===
The T 282 B standard features include an in-cab display screen displaying truck status, fuel consumption, and payload monitoring and downloads. All Liebherr mining trucks include HVAC for operator comfort. The T 282 B is fully compatible with the Liebherr Trolley Assist System, built to save on fuel consumption without sacrificing productivity. Trolley assist is only available for trucks with electric drive systems.

==== Powertrain and engine ====
The T 282 B is powered by a diesel/electric powertrain. The diesel engine is coupled to a Siemens-Liebherr AC electric drive system. Fully loaded, the T 282 B can achieve a top speed of 64 km/h (40 mph).

Two diesel engines are available:

- a 2,720 kW (3,650 hp) DDC/MTU 20V4000, 90 L (5,500 cu in) V20
- 2,600 kW (3,500 hp) Cummins QSK 78 78 L (4,800 cu in) V18.

==== Braking systems ====
The T 282 B features an electric dynamic retard with continuously rated, fan-forced air over stainless steel resistor grid, with a dry disc secondary braking system. Additional features include extended speed range, cruise control, two speed over speed, slip slide traction control, front/rear service brakes, hydraulic accumulators, park brakes, and filtration.

=== Manufacturing and assembly ===
No longer in production, the T 282 B was assembled at the Liebherr Mining Equipment Co. production facility in Newport News.

The chassis (frame, axle box, engine, radiator, fan, and alternator) are assembled for shipment alongside the superstructure (operators' cabin, grid box, and drive system). All other components are implemented on-site with the customer.

=== Specifications ===
Liebherr T 282 B specifications
| Public Introduction | March 29, 2004 |
| Nominal Payload Capacity | 363 t (400 short tons) |
| Gross Machine Operating Weight | 600 t (661 short tons) |
| Engine Make and Model | DDC/MTU 20V4000 or Cummins QSK 78 |
| Engine Arrangement | V-20 (DDC/MTU) or V-18 (Cummins) |
| Net Engine Power | 2,722 kW (3,650 hp) (DDC/MTU) or 2,610 kW (3,500 hp) (Cummins) |
| Top Speed (loaded) | 64 km/h (40 mph) |
| Overall Height to Top of Canopy (empty) | 7.85 m (25 ft 9 in) |
| Overall Height (body raised) | 14.91 m (48 ft 11 in) |
| Overall Length | 15.32 m (50 ft 3 in) |
| Overall Width | 9.53 m (30 ft 15 in) |
| Wheelbase | 6.60 m (21 ft 8 in) |
| Fuel Capacity | 4,732 L (1,250 US gal) |
| Tyre Size | 56/80R63 or 59/80R63 |

== T 282 C ==
The 2010 Liebherr T 282 C offers a payload of up to 360 t (400 short tons) with an Empty Vehicle Weight (EVW) of 237 t (261 short tons) and was built specifically for high-production mining applications worldwide. The T 282 C succeeds the T 282 B, introduced in 2004. The T 282 series is succeeded by the Liebherr T 284.

=== Development and testing ===
In 2010, Liebherr Mining Equipment Newport News Co. designed the T 282 C for reduced cycle time and to have the highest payload-to-EVW in its class, at 237 t (261 short tons). The combination of its high power diesel engine with the efficient Litronic Plus drive system maximizes productivity while reducing fuel consumption.

Engineers incorporated the Litronic Plus drive system and improvements to the electrical systems, including machine health and monitoring systems to offer real-time diagnostics for instantaneous improved reliability and maintainability.

The first T 282 Cs were tested extensively at Liebherr's proving grounds.

=== Public debut ===
The T 282 C was unveiled at the Bauma trade fair in Munich, Germany, in April 2010.

=== Features ===
The T 282 C standard features include the Litronic Plus drive system with real-time fault warning and detection system, CAN Bus technology for flexible monitoring, truck diagnostics, air ride seats with 3 point seatbelts, improved HVAC, greater visibility, and an integrated 300 mm (12 in) colour touch screen in operator cab (displays truck status, fuel consumption, payload monitoring, and downloads).

==== Litronic Plus IGBT AC drive system ====
Designed for mining environments, the control cabinet with integrated rectifier is liquid-cooled, and includes a ground fault warning and detection system. The pressurized cabinet for dust control requires fewer components than GTO drive systems.

==== Tier 2 engine ====
The T 282 C engine is a Tier 2, EPA-compliant diesel MTU/DD 20V4000 2,800 kW (3,750 hp) engine, configurable up to 3,000 kW (4,000 hp). Water-cooled turbo chargers and exhaust manifold keep the engine cool, while the ADEC engine control module monitors fuel consumption and exhaust temperatures at multiple points.

==== Improved electrical systems ====
The T 282 C electrical system has a number of improvements over the T 282 B, including moving the rectifier to the control box, reducing the wiring with Harnessflex conduit, protection against dirt and water ingress via heat shrink connectors, and reducing voltage drip for the starting circuit.

=== Manufacturing and assembly ===
No longer in production, the T 282 C was manufactured and assembled at the Liebherr Mining Equipment Co. production facility in Newport News.

The chassis (frame, axle box, engine, radiator, fan, and alternator) are assembled for shipment alongside the superstructure (operators' cabin, grid box, and drive system). All other components are implemented on-site with the customer.

=== Specifications ===
Liebherr T 282 C specifications
| Public Introduction | April, 2010 |
| Nominal Payload Capacity | 363 t (400 short tons) |
| Gross Machine Operating Weight | 599 t (660 short tons) |
| Engine Make and Model | MTU 20V4000 C22 or C23 Tier II; or Cummins QSK 78 |
| Engine Arrangement | V-20 (DDC/MTU) or V-18 (Cummins) |
| Net Engine Power | 2,722 kW (3,650 hp) (DDC/MTU) or 2,610 kW (3,500 hp) (Cummins) |
| Top Speed (loaded) | 56 km/h (35 mph) |
| Overall Height to Top of Canopy (empty) | 8.31 m (27 ft 3 in) |
| Overall Height (body raised) | 15.06 m (49 ft 5 in) |
| Overall Length | 15.70 m (51 ft 6 in) |
| Overall Width | 9.68 m (31 ft 9 in) |
| Wheelbase | 7.29 m (23 ft 11 in) |
| Fuel Capacity | 5,353 L (1,414 US gal) |
| Tyre Size | 56/80R63 or 59/80R63 |

== Transportation of the T 282 series ==
Due to its exceptional size and weight, the T 282 series cannot be driven on public roads. The T 282 series was shipped in component form to the customer site before undergoing final assembly.

== Cost of the T 282 series ==
No longer in production, the price of each T 282 model varied based upon customer specification and quantity ordered. Each T 282 truck cost US$4–5 million and Liebherr previously sold dozens of the T 282 series each year, primarily to coal, copper, iron ore and gold mine operators in the U.S., Chile, Indonesia, South Africa and Australia.

== Service life of the T 282 series ==
Liebherr offers a flexible component exchange program for replacement of all major components, and maintains affiliates around the world for speedy parts deliveries. The design life of the truck is dependent upon the chassis and frame, which typically last for an average of 72,000 hours.

== Competition ==
The T 282 B competed directly with other 363 t (400 short tons) payload capacity haul trucks, such as are made by Caterpillar Inc.
