= MINExpo International =

MINExpo INTERNATIONAL
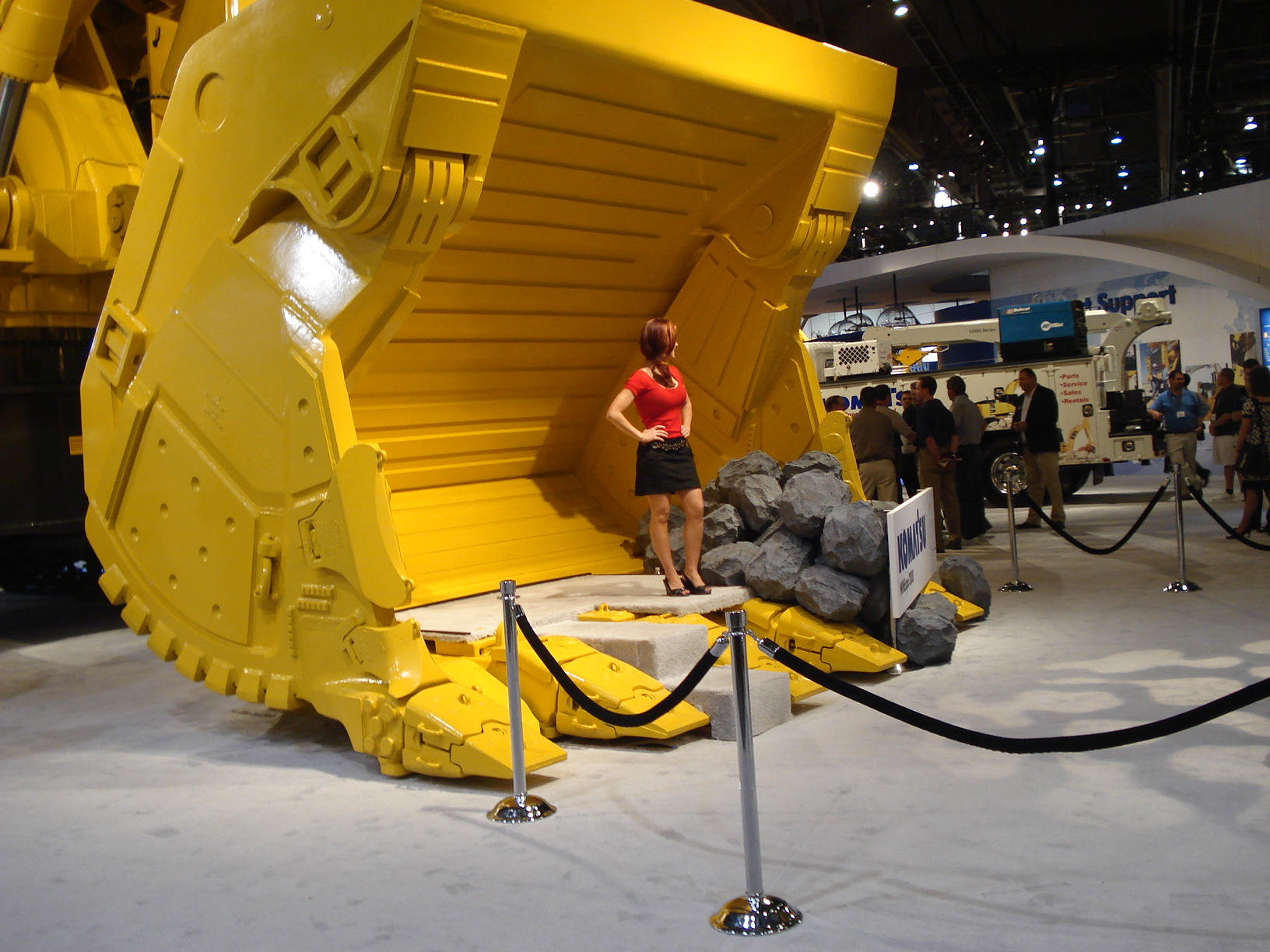
- A model in the bucket of a hydraulic shovel at MINExpo International 2008
- Frequency: Quadrennially
- Venue: Las Vegas Convention Center
- Locations: Las Vegas, Nevada
- Most recent: September 30, 2016
- Organizer: National Mining Association
- Website: minexpo.com

MINExpo International is a trade show sponsored by the National Mining Association. The show exhibits the latest mining and minerals processing technologies, and state-of-the-art machinery and equipment for the coal, metal and nonmetal mining processing industries. Exhibitors include leading mining industry leaders like Caterpillar, Chevron, Brunel and Masaba.

== History ==
MINExpo International is held every four years and has been held at the Las Vegas Convention Center since 1996. The 2008 MINExpo drew over 44,000 people (an increase of over 44% from the previous show in 2004) and 1,025 exhibitors in an area of 600,000 square feet (56,000 m^{2})
