= Haul truck =

Type of dump truck

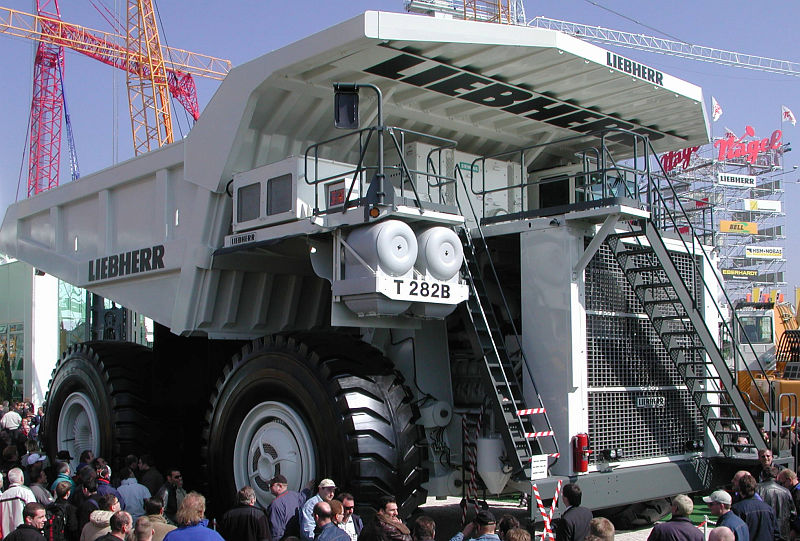
A large 400-short-ton (360-long-ton) Liebherr T 282B "ultra class" haul truck

A haul truck, alternatively known as a mining truck, giant dump truck, or a giant hauler, is an off-road, heavy-duty dump truck specifically engineered for use in high-production mining and exceptionally demanding construction environments. Most are dual axle; at least two examples of tri-axles were made in the 1970s. Haul trucks are denominated by their payload weight capacity.

== Description ==
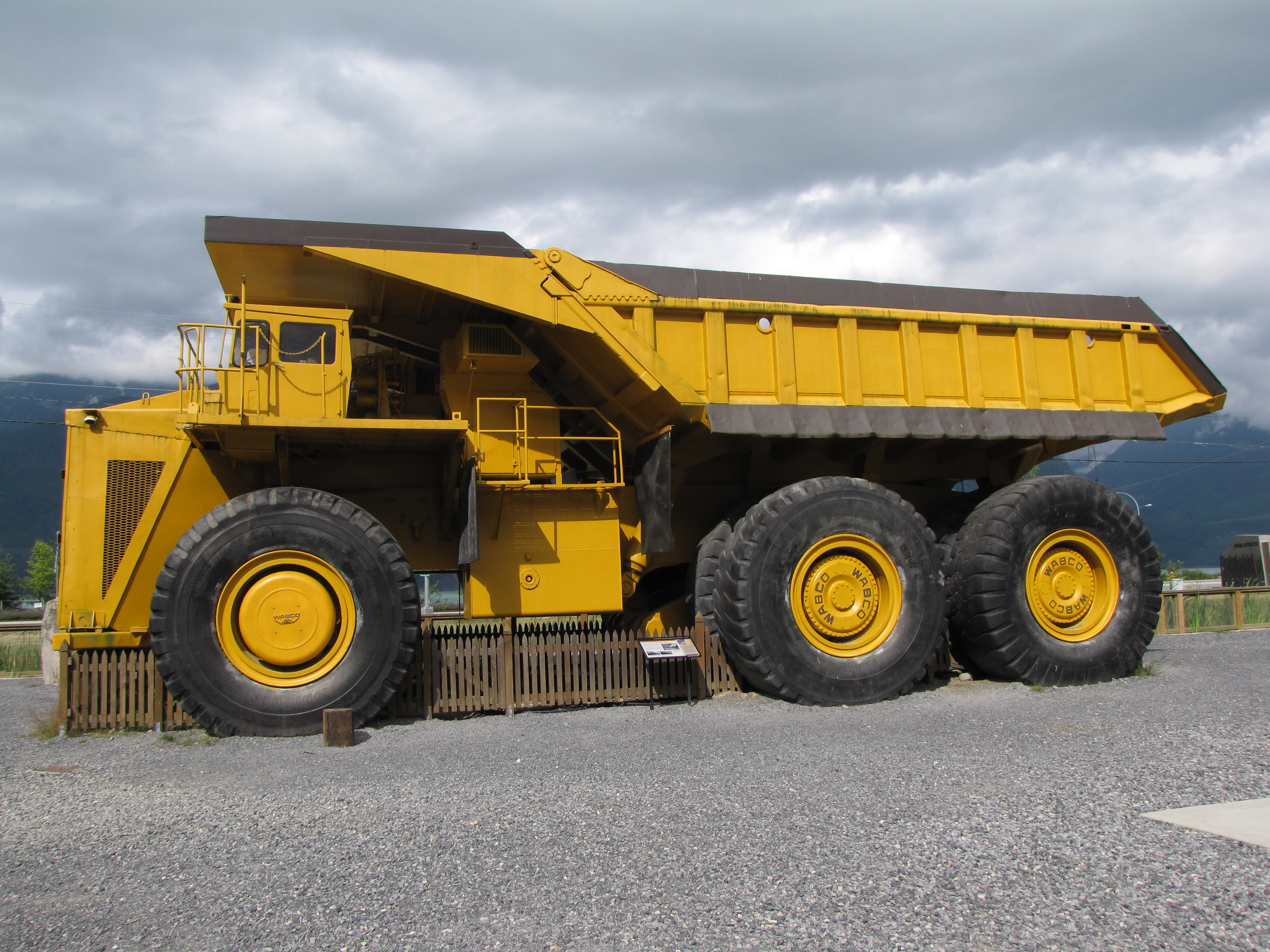
The WABCO 3200 was a rare example of a tri-axle haul truck configuration

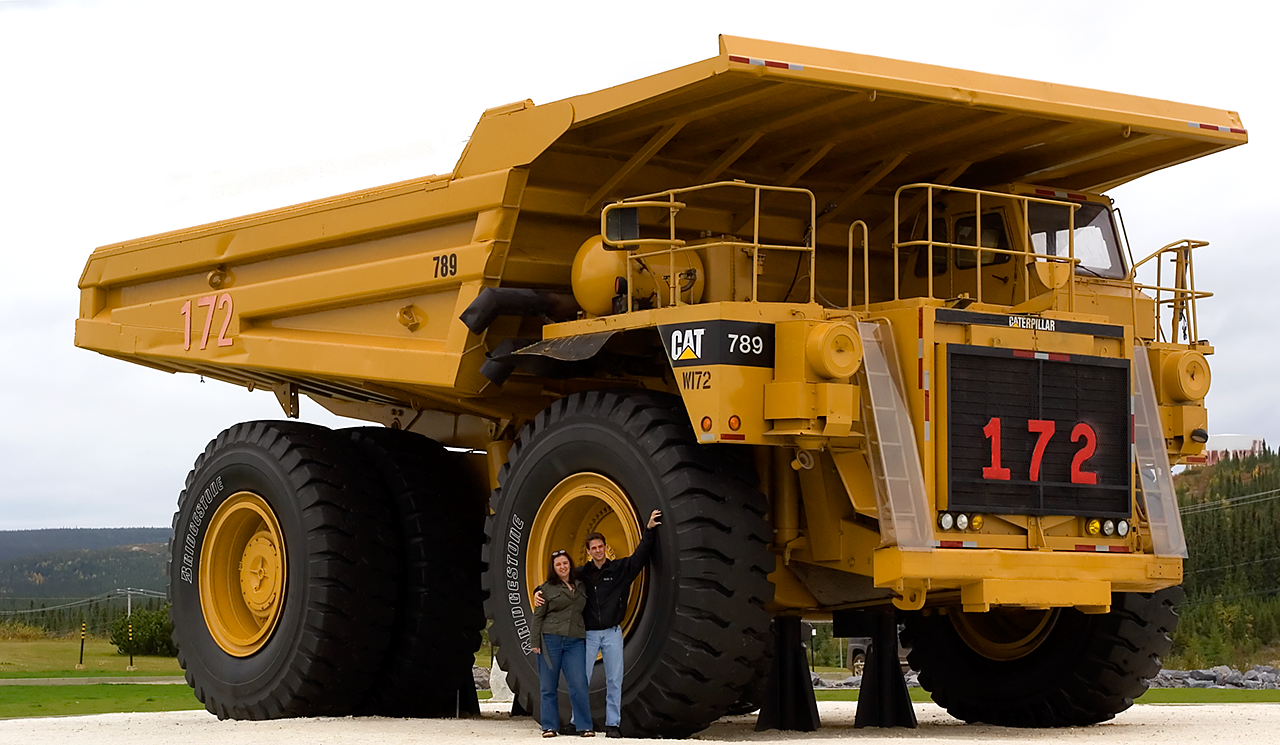
A medium sized haul truck, the 214-short-ton (194 t; 191-long-ton) Caterpillar 789

Most haul trucks have a two-axle design, but two well-known models from the 1970s, the 350T Terex Titan and 235T WABCO 3200/B, had three axles. Haul truck capacities range from 40 short tons (36.3 t; 35.7 long tons) to nearly 500 short tons (454 t; 446 long tons).

An example on the smaller end is the Caterpillar 775 (rated at 70 short tons [62 long tons]). Quarry operations (which produce payloads that have value) typically employ smaller trucks than mining operations (such as removing undesirable overburden, an expense).

Haul trucks can generally be distinguished from standard dump trucks by:

- Being far too large to travel legally on public roads
- Having a dump body made of exceptionally strong steel plate that extends over the cab to protect it, angled upright at its end (or entirely) to aid in dumping; some are heated by exhaust gases to prevent loads from sticking or freezing to the bed;
- Having a driver's cab narrower than its body;
- No axle suspension;
- Limited speed and operating range;
- Special off-road only tires;
- A ratio of dead weight to payload not exceeding 1:1.6

Most large haul trucks use some form of traction motors coupled to regenerative braking for power, braking, or both.

Haul trucks are classified by:

- Type of unloading (dump or rear-eject);
- Direction of discharge (side, rear);
- Type of body (hopper, platform, sliding hopper, sliding platform).

== Ultra class ==
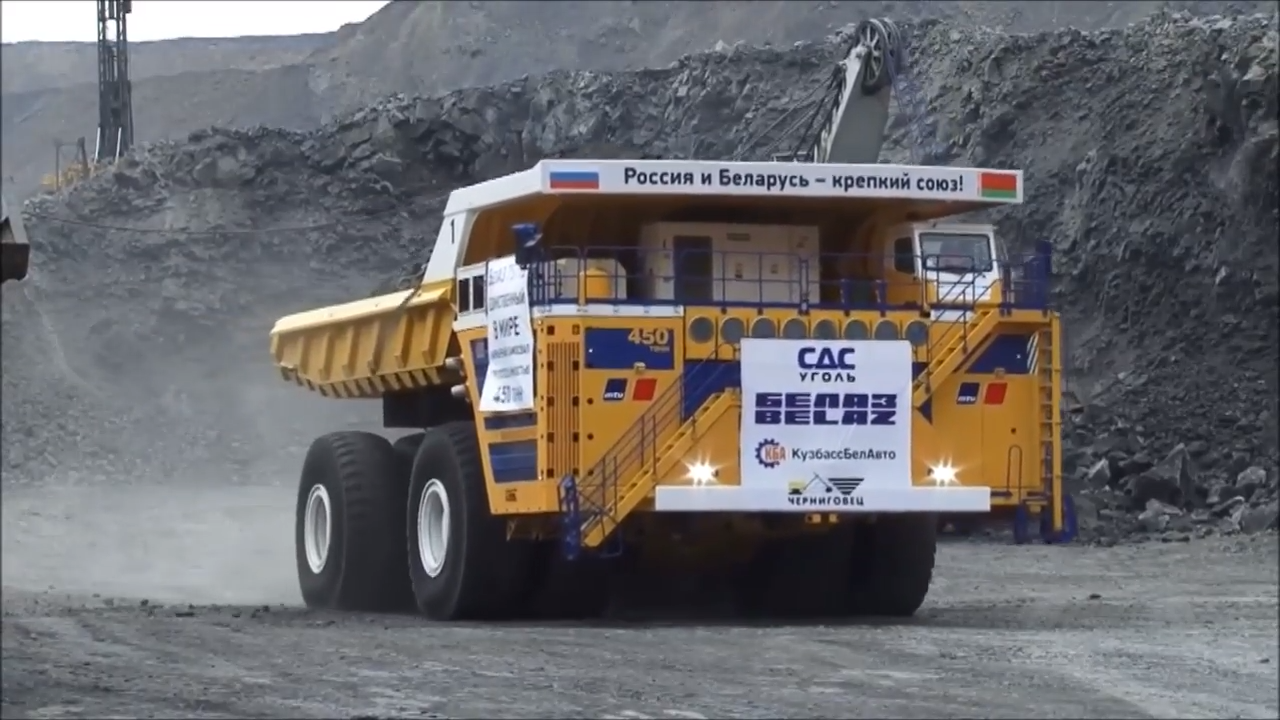
The world's largest ultra class haul truck, the Belarusian 496-short-ton (443-long-ton) BelAZ 75710

The largest haul trucks, with a payload capacity of 300 short tons (270 long tons) or greater, are referred to as ultra class trucks. As of 2025, the BelAZ 75710 is the truck with the highest payload capacity, 450 metric tons (440 long tons; 500 short tons).

== Notable examples ==
Ultra-Class Haul Trucks
No	image	model	manufacturer	first model	Engine	Power (HP)	capacity
1		BelAZ 75710	BelAZ	2013	2 × MTU 16V4000 diesel engines	4,600 hp combined	496 short tons (443 long tons)
2		XCMG XDE440	XCMG	2022	MTU 20V4000	4,000 hp	441 short tons (394 long tons)
3		Caterpillar 798 AC	Caterpillar	2019	Cat C175-16	3,500 hp	410 short tons (366 long tons)
4		Caterpillar 797F	Caterpillar	2009	Cat C175-20	4,000 hp	401 short tons (358 long tons)
5		Liebherr T 284	Liebherr	2004	MTU 20V4000 C22 or Cummins QSK95	4,000 hp	400 short tons (360 long tons)
6		Bucyrus MT6300AC	Bucyrus International	2008	MTU 20V4000	4,000 hp	400 short tons (360 long tons)
7		Terex MT6300AC	Terex	2008	MTU 20V4000	4,000 hp	400 short tons (357 long tons)
8		Komatsu 980E-5SE	Komatsu	2019	Cummins QSK95	4,400 hp	400 short tons (357 long tons)
9		XCMG XDE400	XCMG	2015	MTU 20V4000	4,000 hp	400 short tons (357 long tons)
10		Komatsu 980E-4	Komatsu	2016	Cummins QSK78	3,500 hp	400 short tons (357 long tons)

== See also ==
- Articulated hauler
- Dumper
- Haul road
- Rear-eject haul truck bodies
- Unit Rig
