= Associated Training Services =

- Company type: Private
- Industry: Heavy equipment
- Founded: 1959
- Founder: Robert Klabacka
- Headquarters: Sun Prairie, Wisconsin
- Website: www.operator-school.com

Associated Training Services, commonly known as ATS is a heavy equipment training institution based in Sun Prairie, Wisconsin. It was founded in 1959 by Robert Klabacka as the National Institute of Concrete Construction. The institute offers training programs in heavy equipment, mobile cranes, construction-related trucks, rigging, signaling, and commercial motor vehicles. ATS is one of the oldest training institutions in the United States of America, and has been an accredited sponsor providing accredited crane operator certification through the National Center for Construction Education and Research (NCCER), in Alachua, Florida since 2003, and the National Commission for the Certification of Crane Operators (NCCCO).

== History ==
Klabacka started the Diesel Truck Driver Training School on eighty acres of land ten miles from Madison, Wisconsin in 1963, the organization still maintains its primary office and training facilities at the location. ATS was founded in 1996 as an affiliate of Diesel Truck Driver Training School. Since its formation, Associated Training Services has become a nationally recognized school and has expanded its course offerings.

== Training programs ==
=== Heavy Equipment Training ===
Associated Training Services provides training in following types of heavy equipment.

- Backhoes, Excavators
- Loaders, Bulldozer
- Dump trucks, Class-A CDL
- Wheel tractor-scraper, Grader
- All-Terrain Forklifts, Compactors
- Equipment Transportation
- Site Layout and Grade Reading
- Horizontal Directional Drilling (HDD)
- Digger Derrick

=== Crane Operator Training ===
The school’s crane operator training teaches people how to operate a variety of mobile cranes along with subjects such as:

- Crane set-up
- Wire rope
- Load dynamics
- Lift Planning
- Load Charts
- Rigging
- Signaling

=== NCCCO Certification ===
- Small & Large Hydraulic cranes
- Fixed cab mobile cranes
- Swing cab mobile cranes
- Lattice Boom Cranes
- Written & Practical Pretesting
- Rigger & Signal person Training

=== Rigger/Signalperson ===
The ATS rigger training programs will certify rigger/signalperson personnel to meet the new OSHA crane mandate. Training covers the following

- Inspect rigging before use
- Identify and attach rigging with knowledge of hitch configurations, capacities, and basic knots
- Recognize associated hazards
- Signal operations
- Use of various types of rigging equipment and basic hitches and their applications
- Estimate load weight and center of gravity
- Identify lift points
- Determine and select rigging based on loading
- Perform pre-use inspection of rigging and lift points
- Identify and attach rigging with knowledge of hitch configurations and load angle factors, rigging capacities, and load integrity
- Understand load dynamics and associated hazards

=== Class-A CDL Training ===
ATS provides following CDL learners permit.

- Class-A Commercial License
- Behind-The-Wheel Training
- Local & Long Haul Employment
- Backing/Docking Practice
- Written and Road Testing
- Onsite Recruiting

=== Military Benefits Program ===
Associated Training Services (ATS) is also a veteran's approved training school.
