= ACTE =

ACTE may refer to:

- Association for Career and Technical Education
- Association of Corporate Travel Executives
- Claudia Acte, a mistress of the emperor Nero
- Agency for the Consolidation of Technology in Education
- Acte or Akte, the ancient name of the peninsula now called Mount Athos
- ACTE Adaptive Compliant Trailing Edge, a form of morphing aircraft wing trailing edge designed improve fuel efficiency
- Acte, one of the Horae, goddesses of the hours of the day
