= Career Pathways =

Workforce development

Career Pathways is a workforce development strategy used in the United States to support students' transition from education into the workforce. This strategy has been adopted at the federal, state and local levels in order to increase education, training and learning opportunities for America’s current and emerging workforce.

Career pathways are an integrated collection of programs and services intended to develop students’ core academic, technical and employability skills; provide them with continuous education, training; and place them in high-demand, high-opportunity jobs. Career pathways programs have to consider the diversity of adult learners, and Belzer and Dashew (2023) note that “there are no universal ways to be an adult learner, and educators have to show their willingness to meet adult learners where they are to help them develop their skills, content, and self-concept.”Belzer, Alisa, & Dashew, Brian, eds. Understanding the Adult Learner: Perspectives and Practices, Chapter 1, p. 3 (Routledge, 2023).

A career pathways initiative consists of a partnership among community colleges, workforce and economic development agencies, employers, labor groups, and social service providers, see The Evolution and Potential of Career Pathways U.S. Department of Education, Office of Career, Technical, and Adult Education (OCTAE), April 2015.

Career pathways are increasingly viewed as comprehensive systems that connect education, training, and employment to promote lifelong learning and workforce readiness. According to Advance CTE, a shared national vision for career technical education emphasizes that every learner should have access to high-quality pathways leading to meaningful careers, regardless of their background, age, or location. This vision calls for more equitable systems that align secondary, postsecondary, and workforce partners to ensure that education is responsive to labor market needs and learner goals.

== Providers ==
A number of different organizations provide career pathway initiatives, these include community colleges, government departments and non-profit associations.

Community colleges coordinate occupational training, remediation, academic credentialing, and transfer preparation for career pathways initiatives.

Career pathways models have been adopted at the federal, state and local levels. Given their cross-system nature, states often combine multiple federal streams to fund different elements of career pathways models.

=== US Government ===
The US Department of Labor’s Employment and Training Administration had advocated for career pathways to fill the need for more highly trained and skilled workers.

The US Department of Education’s Office of Vocational and Adult Education (OVAE) has also supported career pathways initiatives to provide students with post-secondary education and training to improve their skills to advance in the workplace. and recently selected five sites as recipients of grants to strengthen their career pathways efforts.

Career Pathways are often referred to as Campus Recruitment Training (CRT) in other Countries like the United Kingdom, China and India. This training program is taken up by Undergraduate colleges to train their students in facing placements through campuses. The program typically imparts training about interviews, group discussion rounds, aptitude and verbal test rounds.

=== Non-profit sector ===
==== Association for Career and Technical Education ====
In addition, the Association for Career and Technical Education (ACTE), the nation’s largest not-for-profit education association dedicated to the advancement of education that prepares youth and adults for successful careers, representing approximately 30,000 educators, administrators and others involved in CTE, supports career pathways and Career Clusters. ACTE has resources on career pathways in its online Research Clearinghouse.

==== National Center for Construction Education and Research ====
Another organization dedicated to workforce development and construction education is National Center for Construction Education and Research (NCCER). NCCER is a not-for-profit 501(c)(3) education foundation created in 1996 to develop standardized construction, maintenance, and pipeline curricula with portable credentials and help address the critical skilled workforce shortage. NCCER's training process of accreditation, instructor certification, standardized curriculum, national registry, assessment, and certification is a key component in the construction industry's workforce development efforts. NCCER is headquartered in Alachua, Fla., and is affiliated with the University of Florida's M.E. Rinker, Sr., School of Building Construction.

== Career Pathways initiative ==
In 2011, in the Midwest, the Joyce Foundation's Shifting Gears Initiative is working to implement career pathways programs in Illinois, Indiana, Michigan, Minnesota, Ohio, and Wisconsin. Other states including Arkansas, California, Kentucky, Oregon, and Washington have statewide career pathways initiatives in place. Cities like New York, Madison, St. Louis, and San Diego have also begun to develop career pathway initiatives for their specific needs. More information on states’ approaches to career pathways is available in ACTE’s State CTE Profiles.

A national Public Service Announcement (PSA) titled "Grads of Life" funded by the Rockefeller Foundation, the Annie E. Casey Foundation, and the W.K. Kellogg Foundation launched in September 2014 to support career pathway initiatives. The campaign presents messages and images to persuade employers that candidates without college degrees but who are graduates of pathway programs can be valued employees.

The state of Oregon defines career pathways as a “series of articulated educational and training programs and services that enables students, often while they are working, to advance over time to successively higher levels of education and employment in a given industry or occupational sector. Each step on a career pathway is designed explicitly to prepare students to progress to the next level of employment and education.” More than 250 career pathway roadmaps are available through Oregon's 17 Community Colleges.

Career pathways initiatives are also in place on the local level, including programs at Madison Area Technical College, Portland Community College, James A. Rhodes State College, Santa Fe College, and South Seattle Community College (Auto, Business Info Tech, Welding, and Hospitality).

In 2016, Career Pathways was supported by the White House National Economic Council, the Office of Management and Budget, the U. S. Departments of Agriculture, Commerce, Defense, Education, Energy, Health and Human Services, Housing and Urban Development, Interior, Justice, Labor, the Social Security Administration, Transportation, and Veterans Affairs.

== See also ==
- Workforce Strategy Center
- Center for Law and Social Policy
