= National Commission for the Certification of Crane Operators =

- Formation: January 1995; 31 years ago
- Legal status: 501(c)(6)
- Purpose: Professional craft certification
- Headquarters: Murray Utah, United States
- Region served: U.S.
- President: Stephanie Wood, Terex Corporation
- Main organ: Board of Directors
- Website: www.nccco.org/home

National Commission for the Certification of Crane Operators commonly referred to by the acronym NCCCO is a non-profit organization, established in January 1995 and headquartered in Murray, Utah, United States with a regional office in Palm Harbor, Florida.

== Organization ==
The organization is run by a 9-member Board of Directors with a President, Vice-President, and a 30-member Commission representing 10 distinct industry groups. The Commissioners oversee ten Exam Management Committees with the responsibility of monitoring written and practical certification examinations for mobile, tower, overhead, and articulating (loader or knuckle-boom) crane operators, digger derrick operators, drill rig operators, dedicated pile driver operators, concrete pump operators, crane inspectors, lift directors, signal persons, and riggers. There is also an Ethics and Discipline Committee that establishes ethical standards and standards of conduct respectively.

== Accreditation ==
CCO certifications are accredited by the ANSI National e (ANSI) for fairness, validity, and reliability in testing, and the covered written and practical testing, including Rigger Level I and II programs. OSHA has recognized NCCCO since 1999.

== OSHA ==
OSHA will begin requiring accredited crane operator certification on November 10, 2018, the final compliance date, but since the 2017 delay the NCCCO has maintained not waiting. The Associated General Contractors of America (AGC) joined with members of the Coalition for Crane Operator Safety (CCOS) and urged Congress to finalize the rule. Most of the crane industry has been against the inclusion of a rated operating capacity (ROC) as well as a provision that the employer evaluate operators concerning their ability to safely operate assigned equipment and document the evaluation. The first part is not included but the employer provision was added back.
