= Moving floor =

Hydraulically driven conveyance system

A moving floor is a hydraulically-driven moving-floor conveyance system for moving bulk material or palletized products, which can be used in a warehouse, loading dock or semi-trailer. It automates and facilitates loading and unloading of palletized goods by eliminating the need for a forklift to enter the trailer. In a truck-based application, the system can quickly unload loose material without having to tip the trailer or tilt the floor as with other dumping systems. In a bulk material application such as a waste facility, these systems can reduce double handling by allowing any vehicle to deliver material to the conveying floor and move heavy bulk materials to subsequent stages of a process. For bagged waste, the system can also be combined with bag openers.

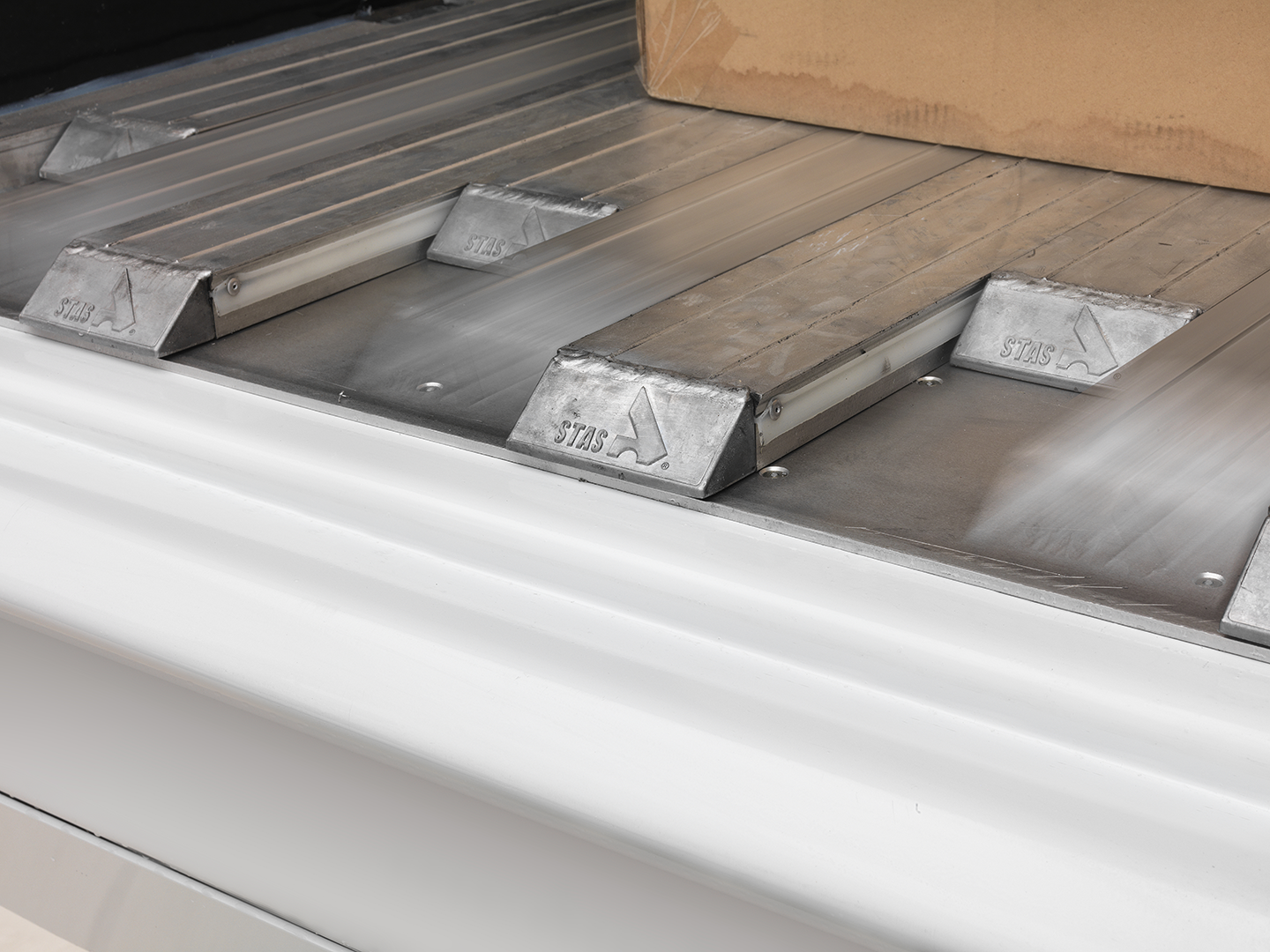
Walking floor system in a semi-trailer

== How it works ==
The moving floor is divided into three sets of narrow floor slats, with every third slat connected together, hydraulically powered to move forward and backward either in unison or alternately. When all three sets move in unison, the load is moved upon them in the direction the operator wishes. Slat retraction (during which the load does not move) is accomplished by moving only one set of slats at a time. (The friction of the load on the two stationary sets of slats keeps the load from moving while a single set of slats alternately slides past.)

four steps of a moving floor system

== Use in a trailer ==
Optionally, the semi-trailer may include a movable front wall with a rubber flap at the bottom extending onto the floor, or simply a movable flap or tarp at the front of the trailer bed on which the material is loaded. During unloading of loose material, either of these will ensure that nothing is left behind, almost eliminating the need to sweep the floor.

It takes about 5 to 15 minutes to unload a full 13.6-metre (45-foot) trailer, taking less manpower, equipment and time than without the system. The operator can enter a narrow low gate and dump the load inside a building. With a conventional tipper (or dump truck) as well as a dump trailer, that is often not possible. It is also possible to handle full-width or full-length pallets without opening the sides of the trailer.

== Conveying pallets ==
A similar system is designed specifically for moving pallets. It uses only two (rather than three) sets of slats, where one set raises the load just enough for the second set to retract. After the load-raiser lowers and retracts, both sets move together to actually move the load. Load capacity is 30 short tons (26.8 long tons; 27.2 t) and floor speed is up to 12 feet per minute (3.66 m/min).

== See also ==
- Live bottom trailer
- Moving walkway
