= Live bottom trailer =

Vehicle used for hauling loose material

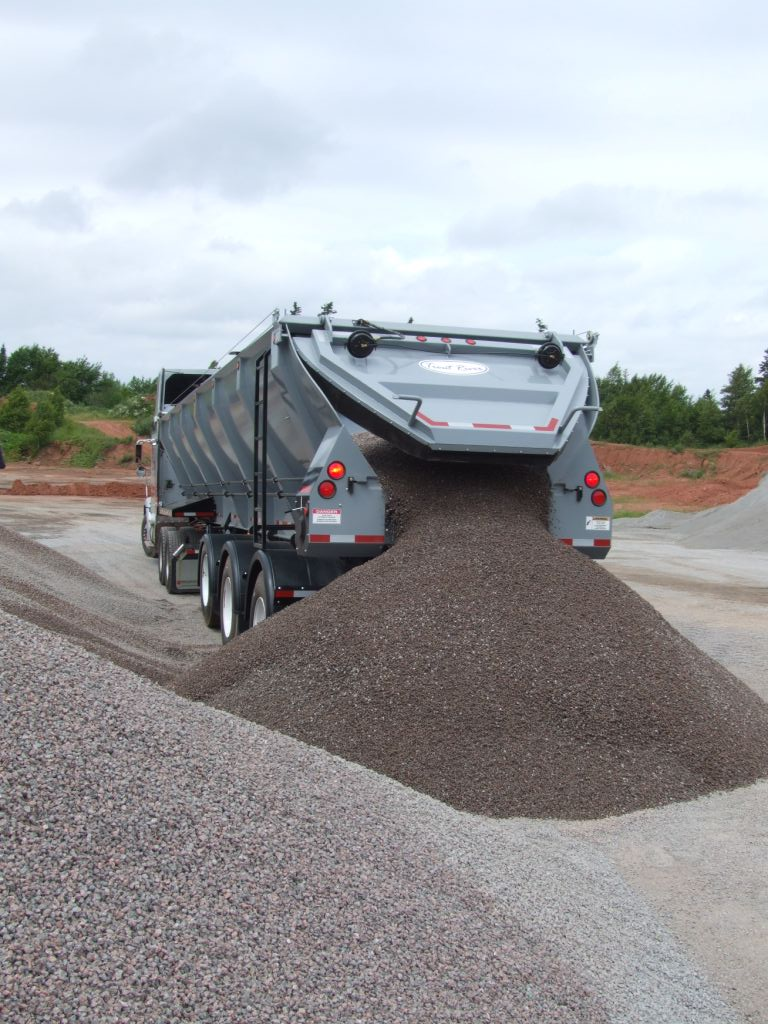
A live bottom trailer

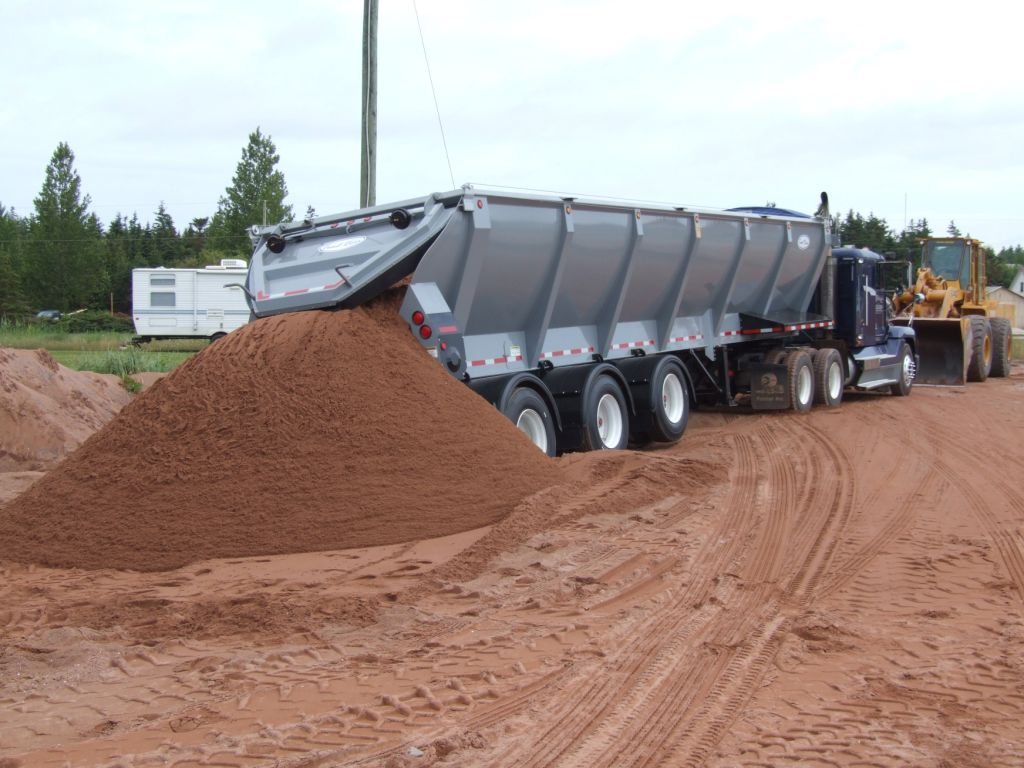
A live bottom trailer

A live bottom trailer is a semi-trailer used for hauling loose material such as asphalt, grain, potatoes, sand and gravel. A live bottom trailer is an alternative to a dump truck or an end dump trailer. The typical live bottom trailer has a conveyor belt on the bottom of the trailer tub that pushes the material out of the back of the trailer at a controlled pace. Unlike the conventional dump truck, the tub does not have to be raised to deposit the materials.

== Operation ==
The live bottom trailer is powered by a hydraulic system. When the operator engages the truck's hydraulic system, it activates the conveyor belt, moving the load horizontally out of the back trailer.

== Uses ==
Live bottom trailers can haul a variety of products including gravel, potatoes, topsoil, grain, carrots, sand, lime, peat moss, asphalt, compost, rip-rap, heavy rocks, biowaste, etc. Those who work in industries such as agriculture and construction benefit from the speed of unloading and the versatility of the trailer and chassis mount.

== Safety ==
The live bottom trailer eliminates trailer rollover because the tub does not have to be raised in the air to unload the materials. The trailer has a lower centre of gravity which makes it easy for the trailer to unload in an uneven area, compared to dump trailers that have to be on level ground to unload. Overhead electrical wires are a danger for the conventional dump trailer during unloading, but with a live bottom, wires are not a problem. The trailer can work anywhere that it can drive into because the tub does not have to be raised for unloading. In addition, the truck cannot be accidentally driven with the trailer raised, which has been a cause of a number of accidents, often involving collisions with bridges, overpasses, or overhead/suspended traffic signs/lights.

== Advantages ==
The tub empties cleanly, making it easier for different materials to be transported without having to get inside the tub to clean it out. The conveyor belt allows the material to be dumped at a controlled pace so that the material can be partially unloaded where it is needed. The rounded tub results in a lower centre of gravity which means a smoother ride and better handling than other trailers. Working under bridges and in confined areas is easier with a live bottom as opposed to a dump trailer because it can fit anywhere it can drive. Wet or dry materials can be hauled in a live bottom trailer.

In a dump truck, wet materials stick in the top of the tub during unloading and cause trailer rollover. Insurance costs are lower for a live bottom trailer because it does not have to be raised in the air and there are few cases of trailer rollover.

== Disadvantages ==
Some live bottom trailers are not well suited for heavy rock and demolition. However rip-rap, heavy rock, and asphalt can be hauled if built with the appropriate strength steels.

== See also ==
- Moving floor, a hydraulically driven conveyance system also used in semi-trailers
