= Dart (commercial vehicle) =

American motor vehicle manufacturer

Dart Manufacturing Company (and follow up companys)
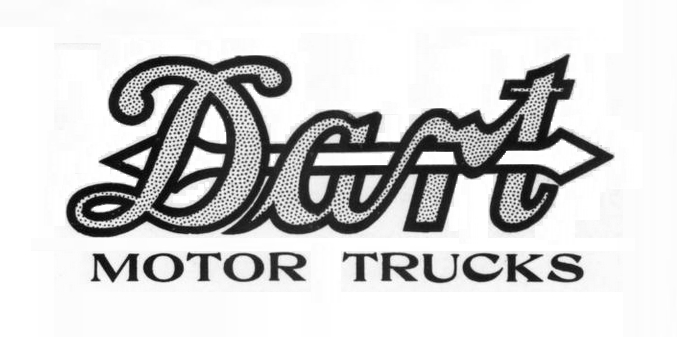
- Industry: Automotive
- Founder: Wm. Galloway
- Successor: more of one successor(s)
- Products: Automobiles, trucks

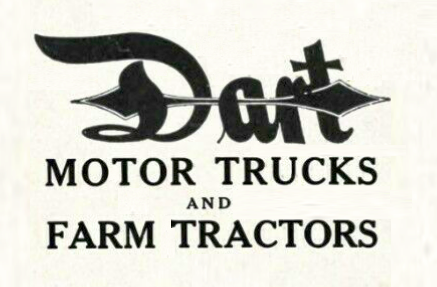
Dart Logo (ca. 1918-1924)

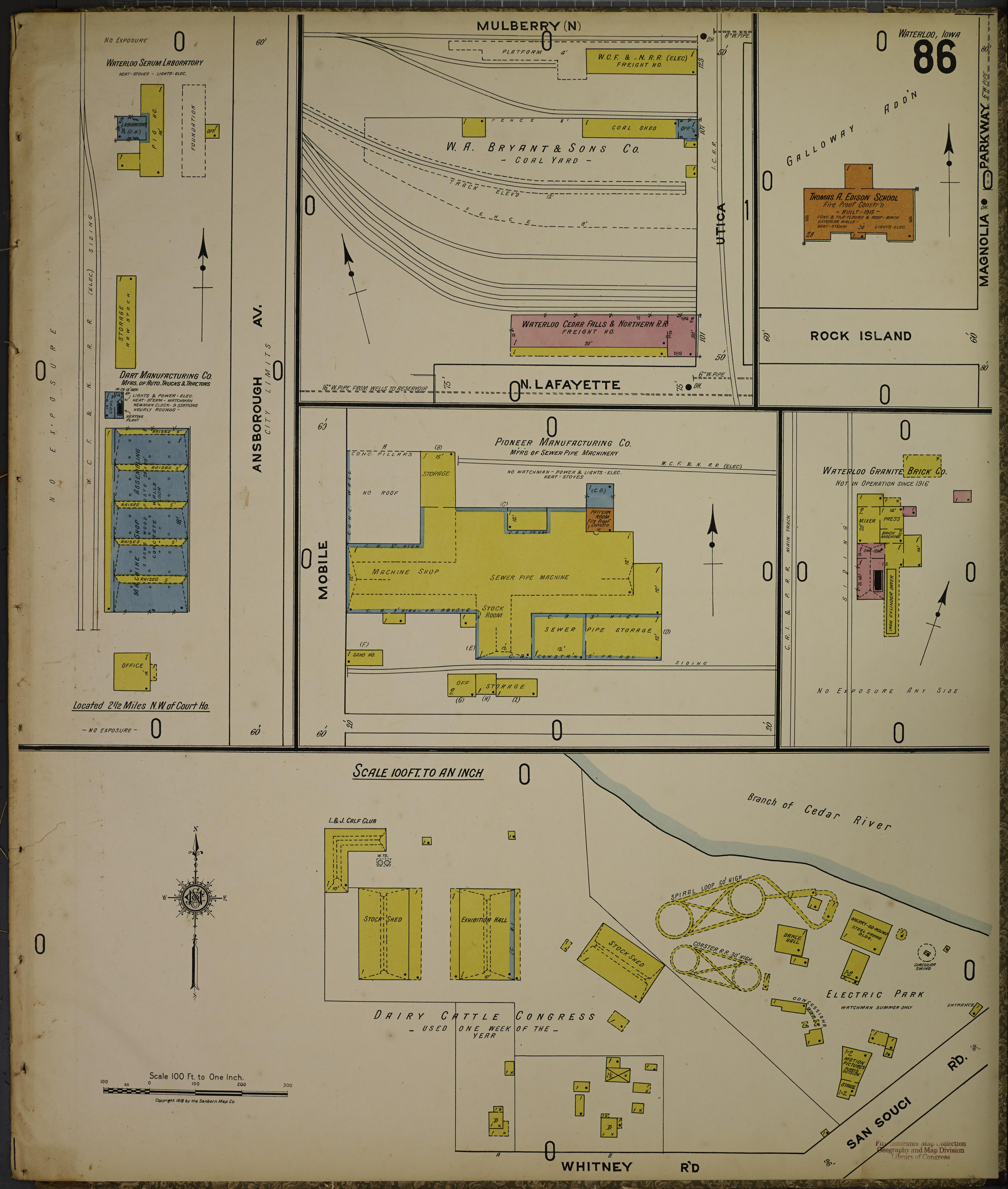
Dart plant (1918)

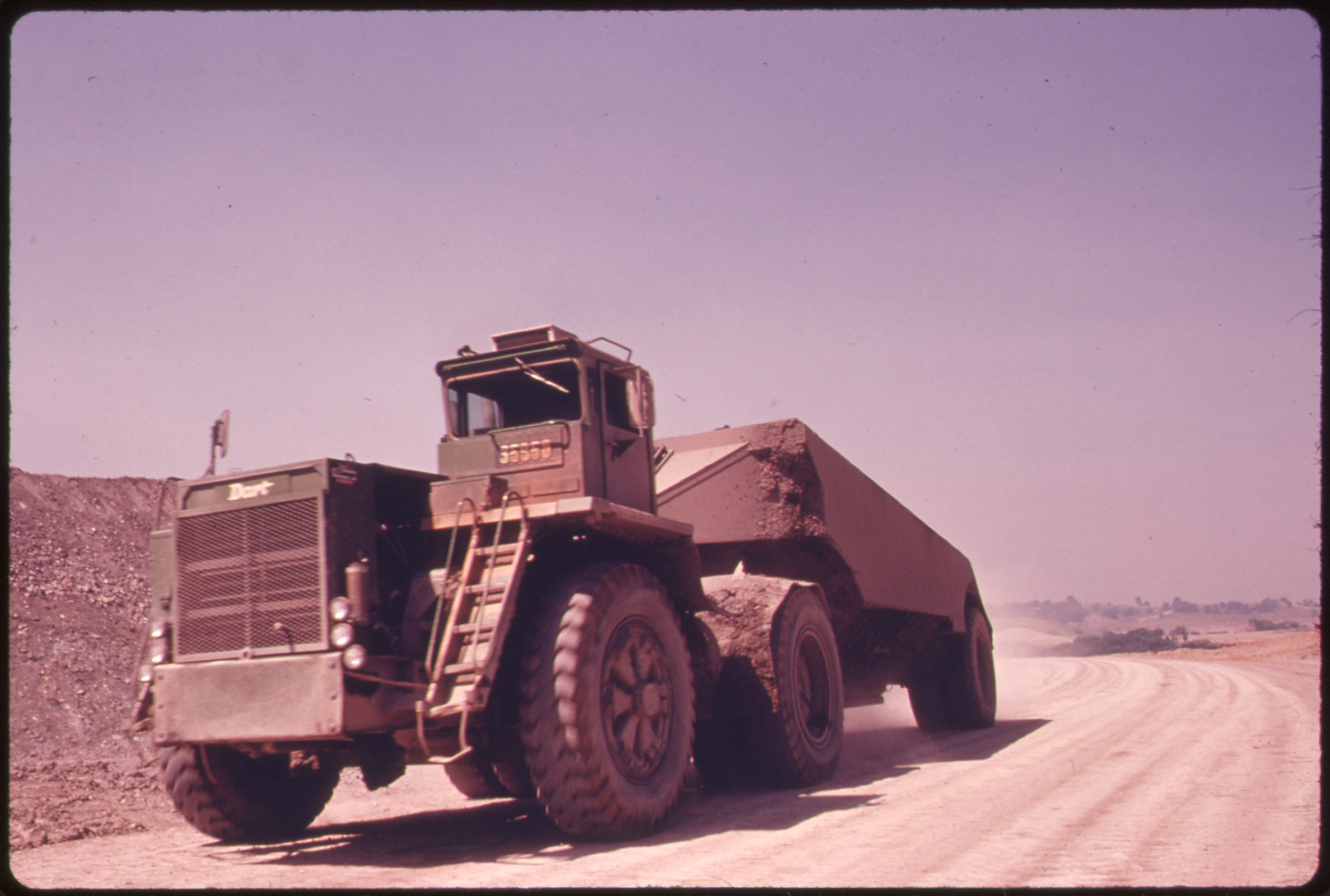
Dart bottom-dump Tractor-trailer (1970)

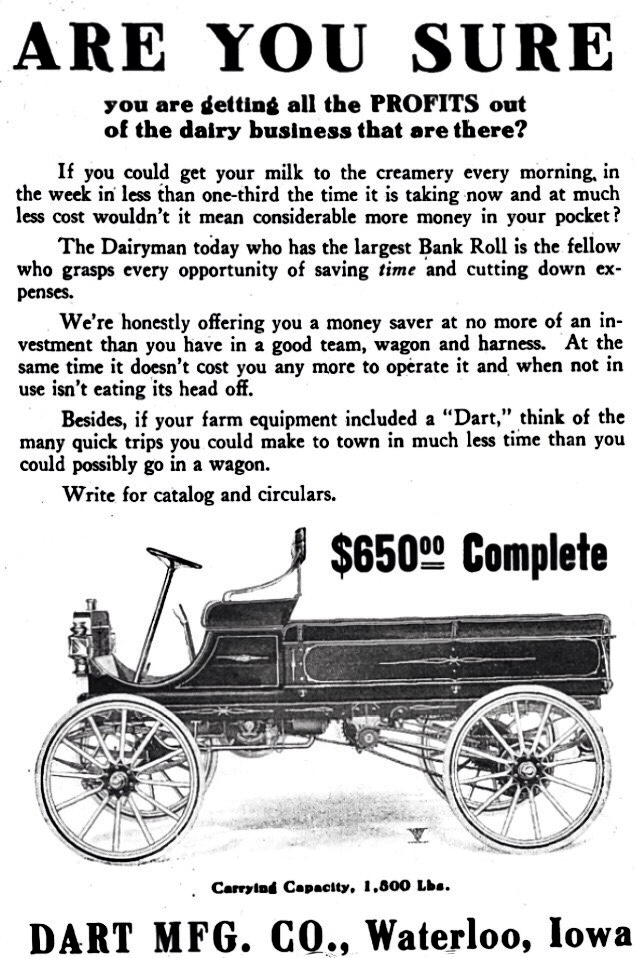
Dart 1500 lbs (1911)

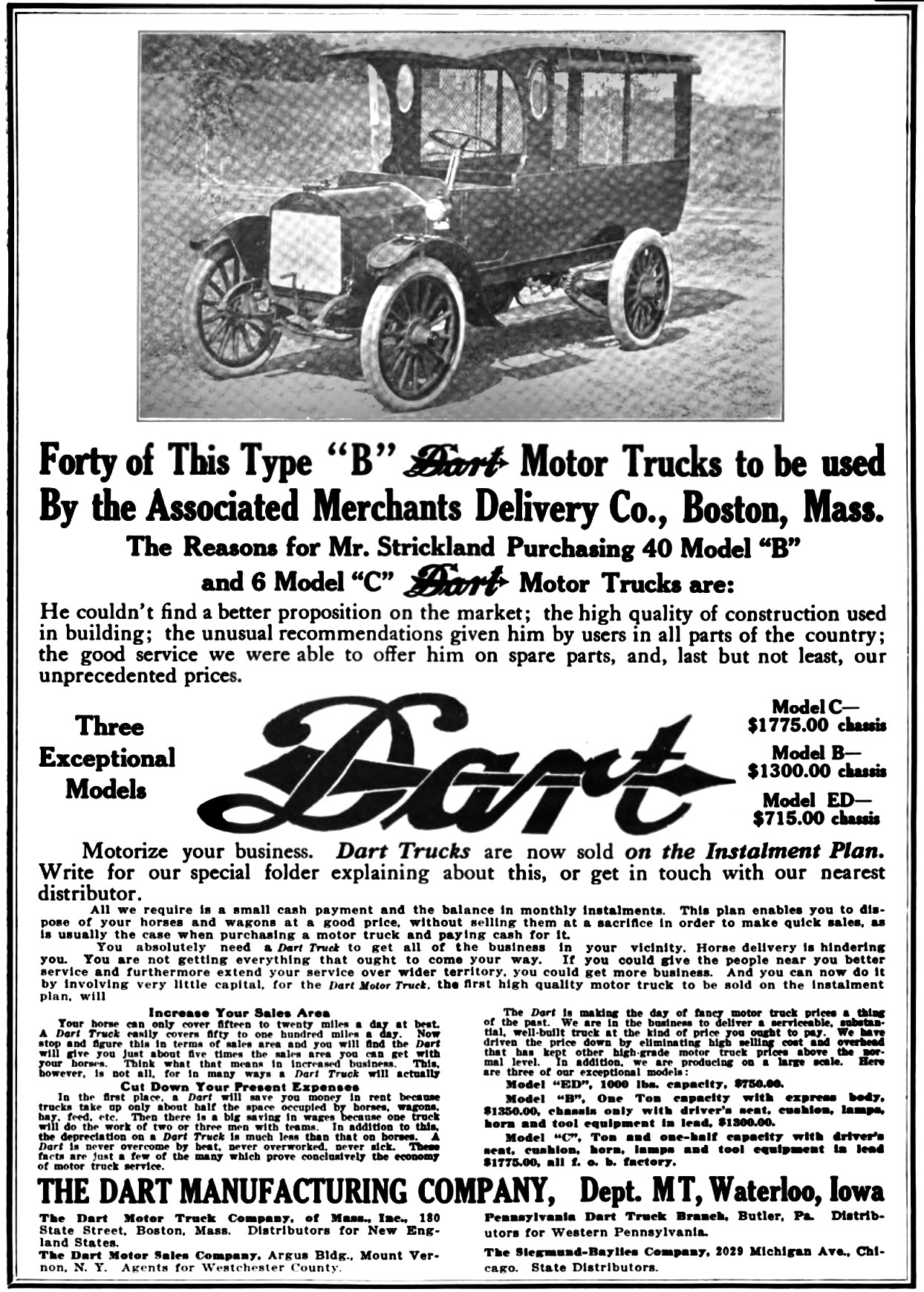
Dart Model B, C (1913)

Dart was a manufacturer of commercial vehicles in that was established in 1903.

== History ==
The company started as a bicycle manufacturer in Anderson, Indiana in 1890. The first trucks (1/2 ton, 20 hp two-cylinder engines) were produced in 1903 and Dart relocated to Waterloo, Iowa in 1907. In 1912 the trucks were redesigned and Dart offered 1/2 ton, 1 ton, and 1 1/2 ton models with four-cylinder engines. By April 1916 seven models were available, ranging from 1/2 ton to three ton. 1925 found Dart in Kansas City, Missouri and named the Dart Truck Company. During World War II the company introduced 10 ton trucks as well as 40 ton tank transporters. They also produced the CC-4 Liberty truck.

In 1958 the company was bought out by Paccar. Dart's trucks continued to grow in size, with 70 ton units produced in the 50s, increasing to 100 ton dump trucks and 120 ton bottom-dump tractor trailers in the 60s, primarily for mining and other off-highway use.

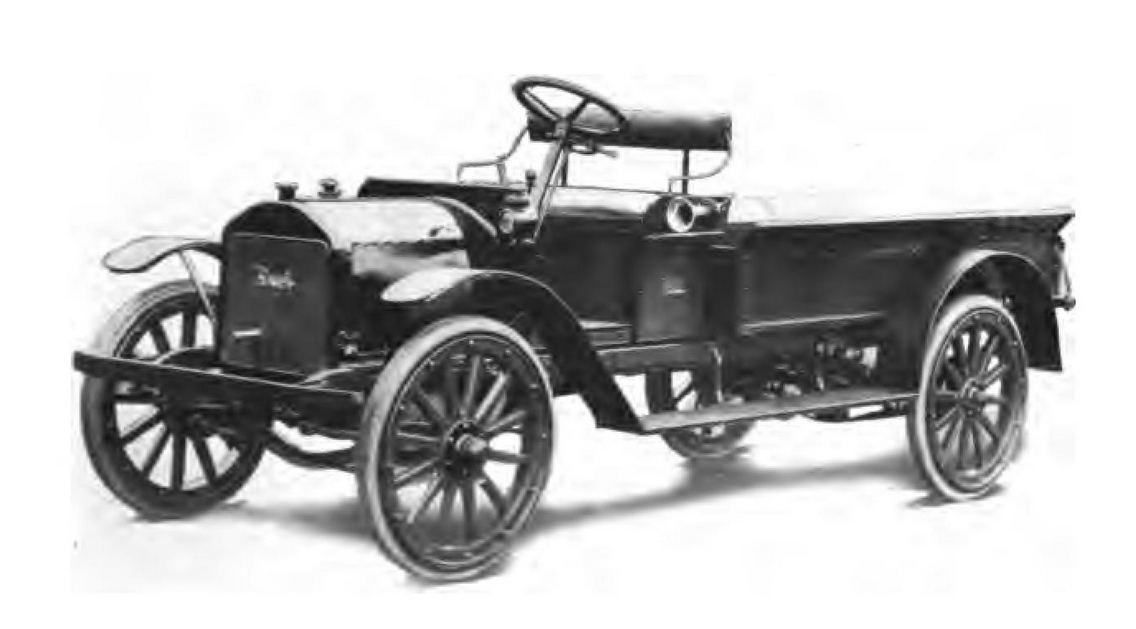
Dart Modell BB 1916 (Dart 1000-Pound-Commercial-Car)

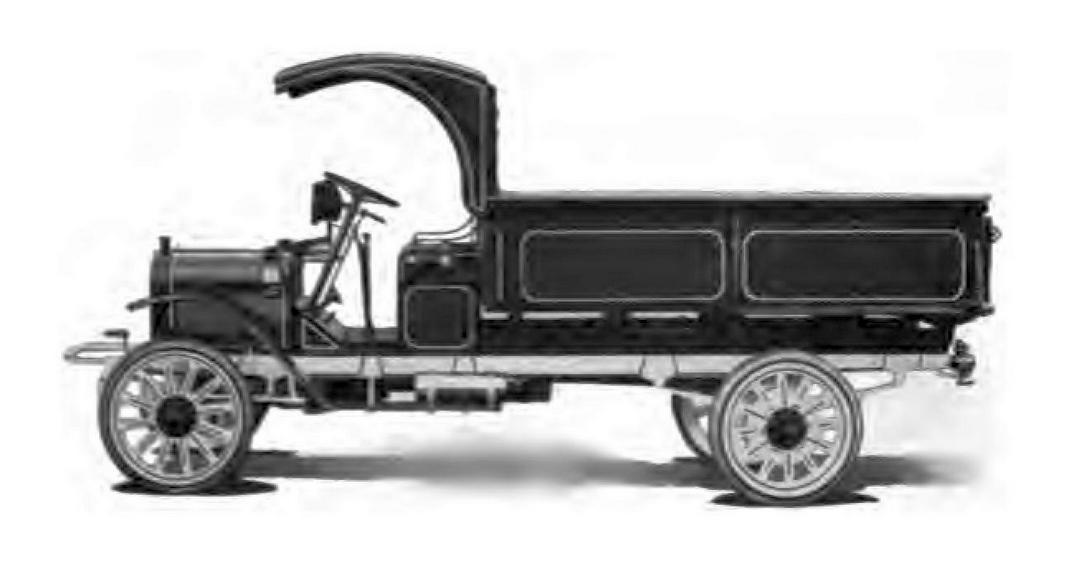
Dart Modell E 1916 (Dart One-Ton-Truck)

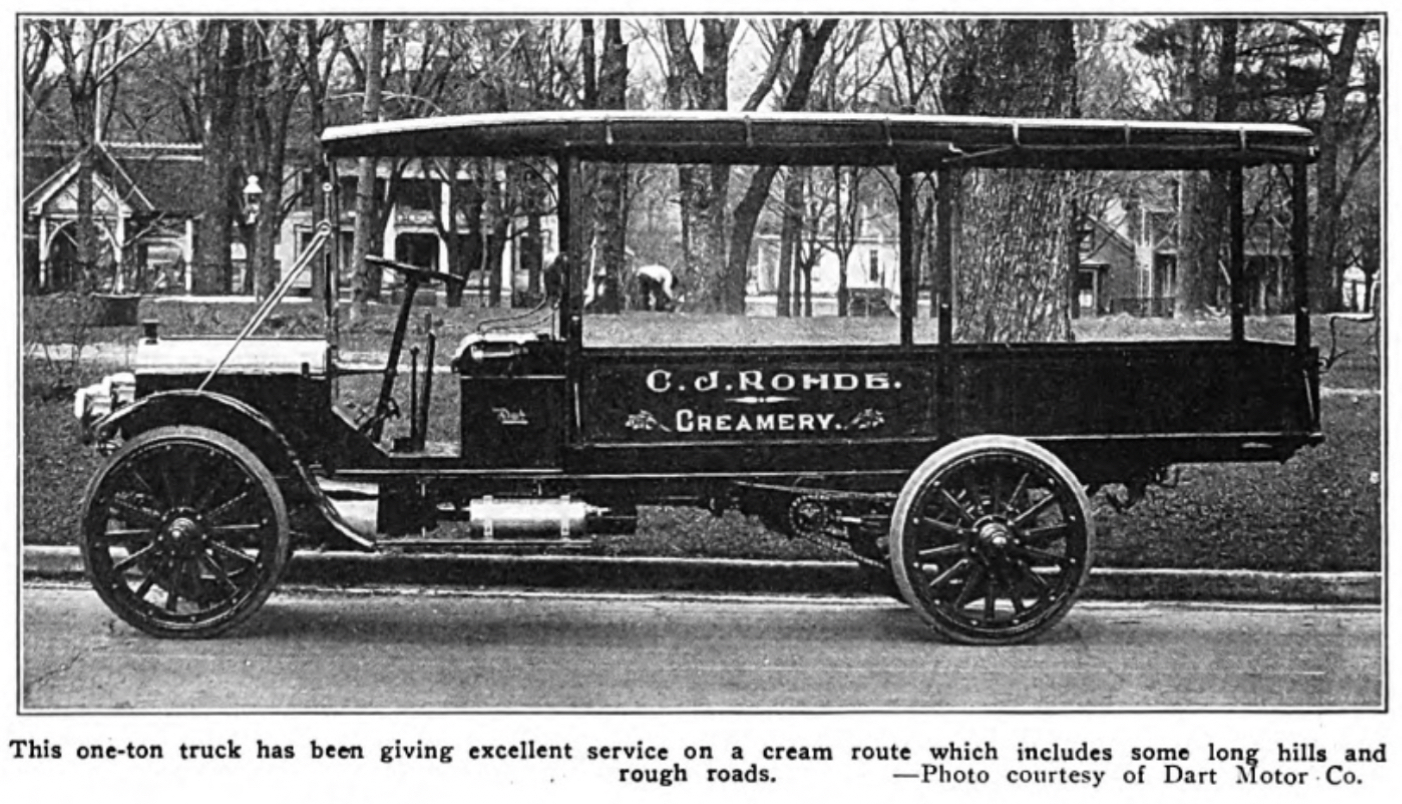
Dart 1t (1916)

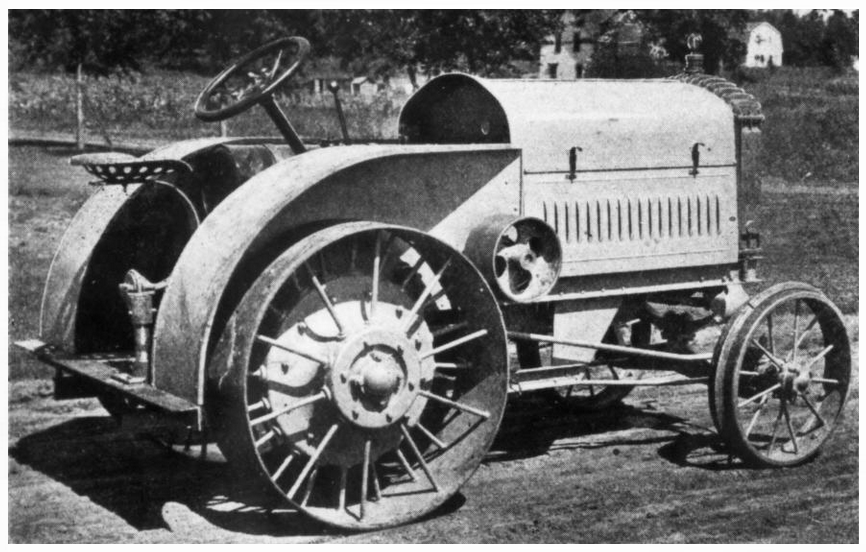
Dart Blue J 1918 (tractor)
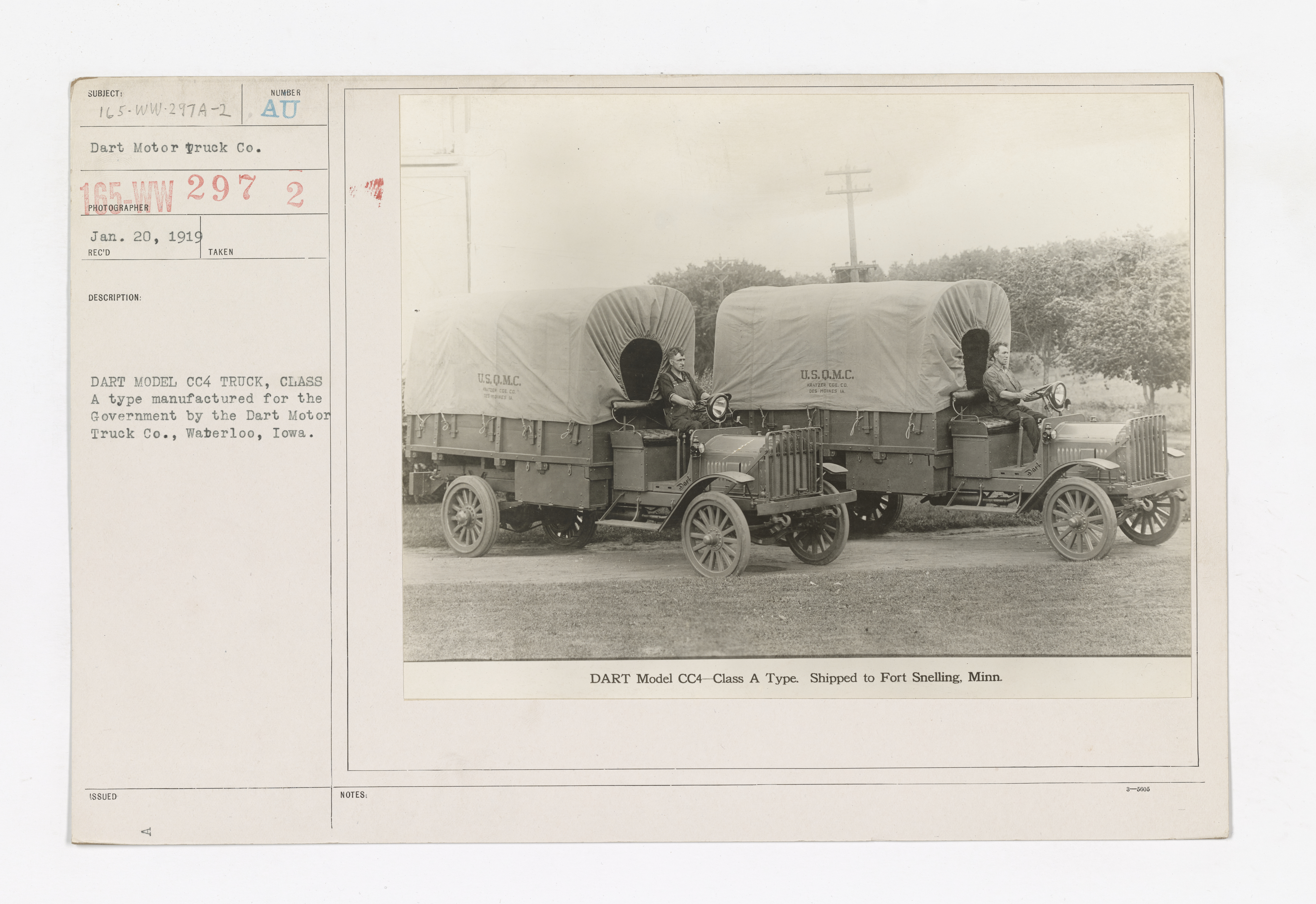
Liberty Truck Dart Model CC4

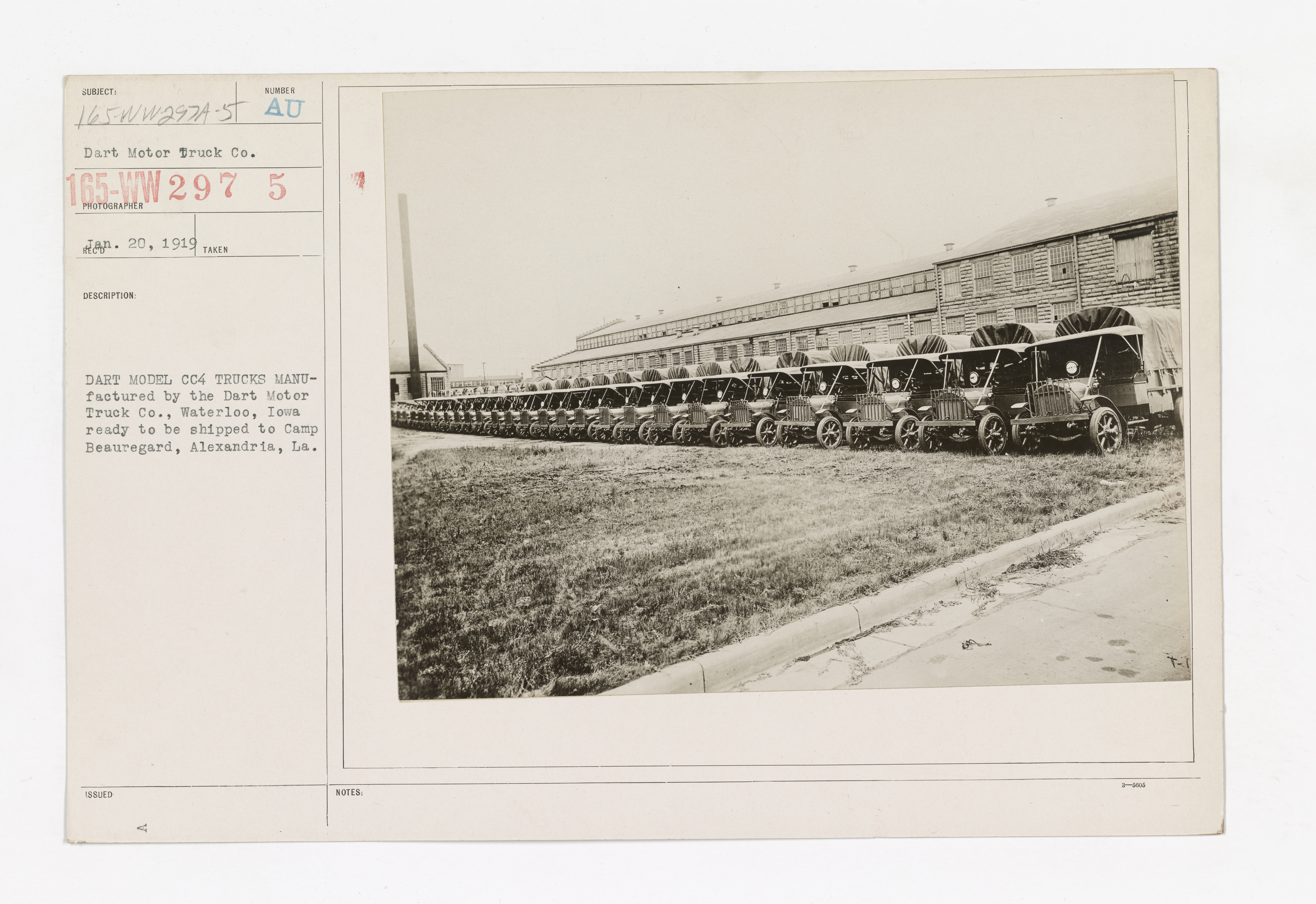
Dart Type CC4 (for Camp Beauregard)

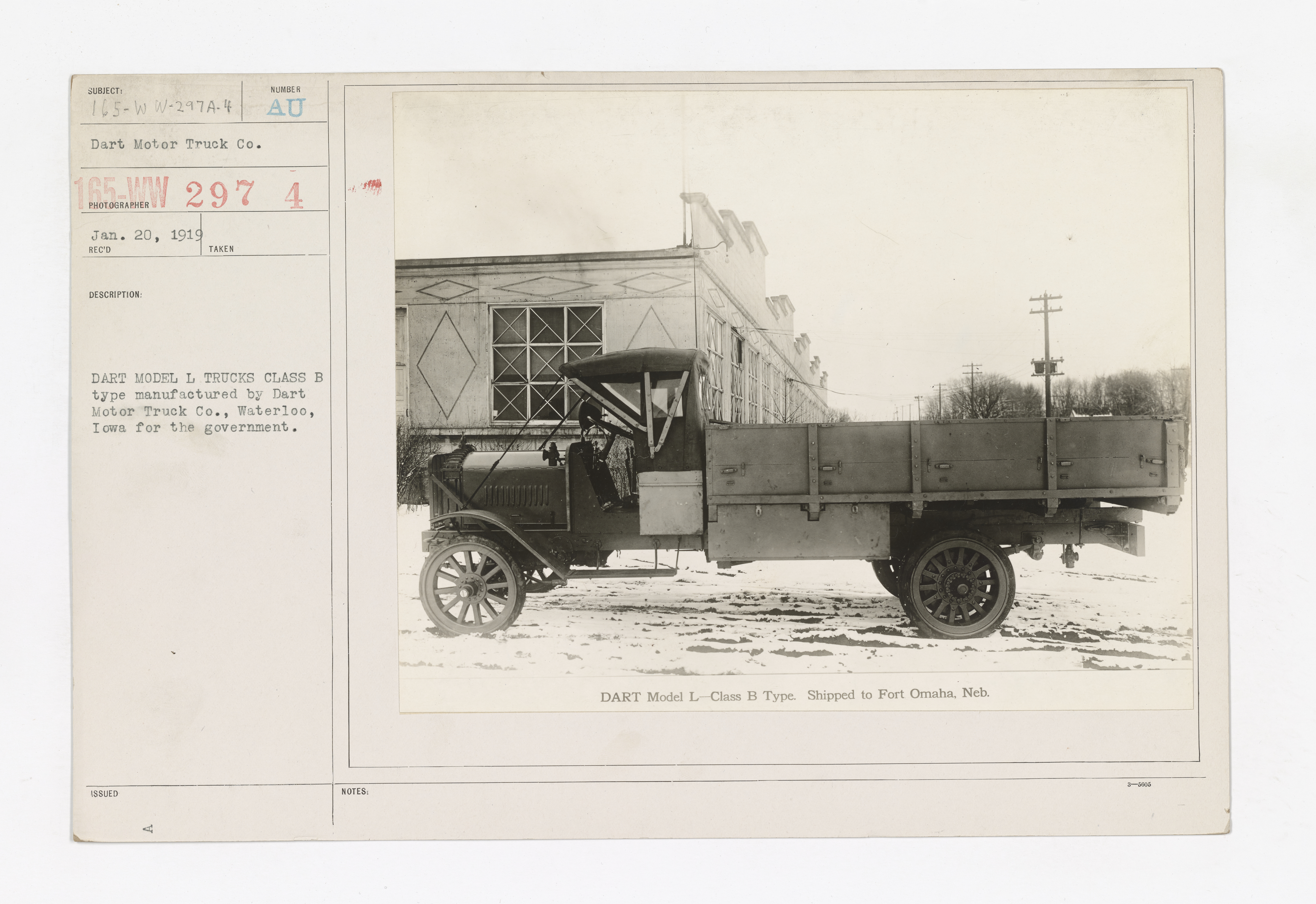
Dart Modell L (Liberty-Class B 3,5 ton double wheels at rear axle)
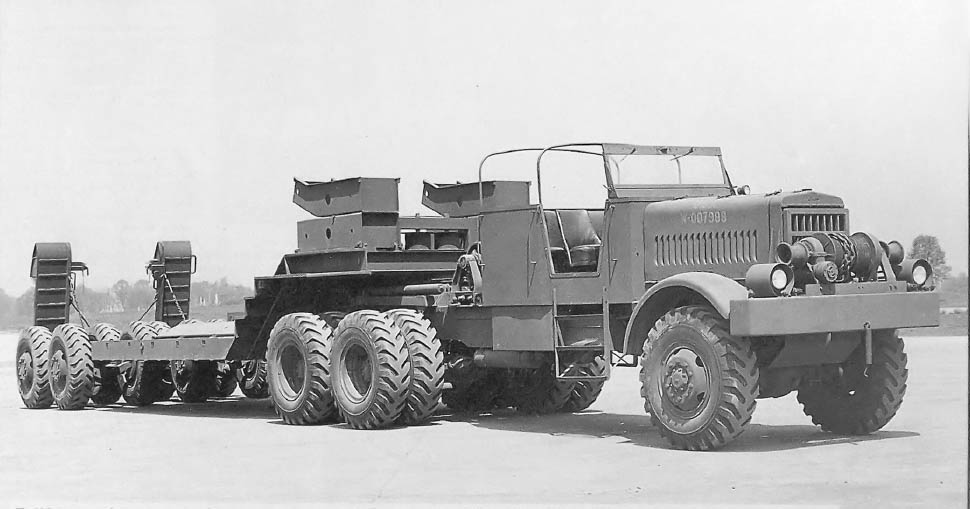
Dart T13 around 1942

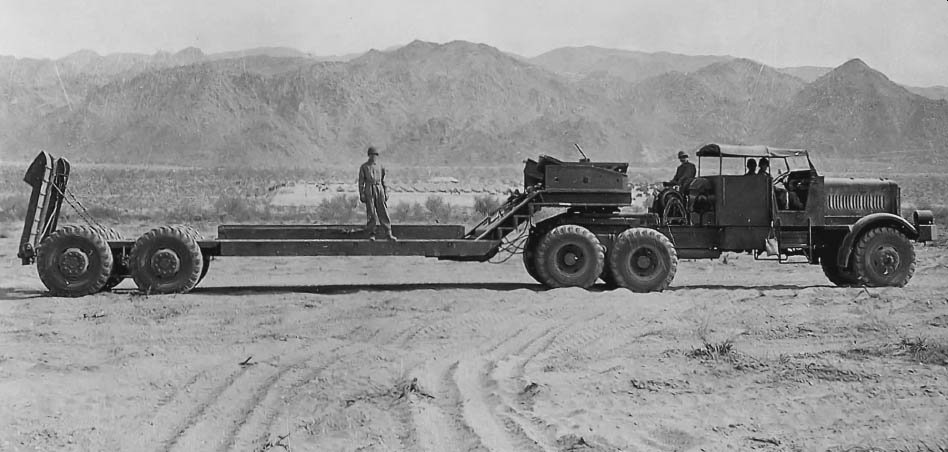
Dart T13 around 1942

=== Production figures Dart trucks ===
The pre-assigned serial numbers only indicate the maximum possible production quantity.

Year	Production figures	Model	Load capacity	Serial number
1913		ED	0,5 to	
	~ 40	B	1 to	
	~ 6	C	1,5 to	
1918	~ 50	E	1 to	39050 to 39100
1918	~ 100	CC-4	2 to	27050 to 27150
1918	~ 35	L	3,5 to	29000 to 29035
1919	~ 75	E	1 to	39100 to 39175
1919	~ 115	CC-4	2 to	27151 to 27265
1919	~ 30	L	3,5 to	29036 to 29065
1920		H	1 to	1001 to ?
1920		S	1,5 to	1501 to
1920		M	2,5 to	2001 to
1920		W	3,5 to	7001 to 9501
1920		TE-Tractor		201 to
1920		TU-Tractor		1001 to
1926		M	2,5 to	2000 to
1926		O	3 to	2500 to
1926		H	2 to	2000 to
1927		M	2,5 to	2000 to
1927		O	3 to	2500 to
1927		H	2 to	2000 to
1928		40	2 to	2000 to
1928		50 C (4 Cylinder)	2,5 to	2500 to
1928		50 C (6 Cylinder)	2,5 to	2500 to
1928		50 T	2 to	2500 to
1928		60 (4 Cylinder)	3 to	2500 to
1928		60 (6 Cylinder)	3 to	2500 to
2012		3100 B	100 to	
Sum				

== See also ==
- Paccar
- Liberty truck
- Class 8 Trucks
- Dump truck
- Haul truck
- Semi-trailer truck

== Bibliography ==
- James F. Bellamy (1989), Cars made in upstate New York (in German), New York: Squire Hill Publishing Company, ISBN 0-9621010-0-1
- Fred W. Crismon (2001), U.S. military wheeled vehicles (in German), Minneapolis, ISBN 0-9700567-1-0
- George Nicholas Georgano, ed. (1979), The Complete Encyclopedia of Commercial Vehicles (in German), Osceola: Motorbooks International, ISBN 0-87341-024-6
- Roy Burton Gray (1954), American Society of Agricultural Engineers (ed.), Development of the Agricultural Tractor in the United States: Up to 1919 inclusive (in German), Beltsville: US Department of Agriculture, OCLC 924551112
- Keith Haddock (1998), Giant Earthmovers: An Illustrated History (in German), Wisconsin: MBI, ISBN 0-7603-0369-X
- Keith Haddock (2007), The Earthmover Encyclopedia (in German), St. Paul, Minn.: MBI, ISBN 978-0-7603-2964-1
- McClure's magazine, ed. (1916), Automobile year book (in German), New York: Automobile Dept. of McClure's magazine, the McClure Publications, OCLC 2848714
- Albert Mroz (2010), American Cars, Trucks and Motorcycles of World War I (in German), Jefferson, N.C.: McFarland, ISBN 978-0-7864-5725-0
- Albert Mroz (1996), The Illustrated Encyclopedia of American Trucks and Commercial Vehicles (in German), Iola: Krause Publications, ISBN 0-87341-368-7
- Halwart Schrader, Jan P. Norbye (1998), Das Lastwagen-Lexikon: alle Marken 1900 bis heute (in German), Stuttgart: Schrader, Motorbuch, ISBN 3-613-01837-3
- Marián Šuman-Hreblay (2000), Automobile manufacturers worldwide registry (in German), London: McFarland, ISBN 0-7864-0972-X
- John Tipler (2000), Heavy equipment (in German), Edicon, N.J.: Chartwell Books, ISBN 0-7858-1171-0
- Bart H. Vanderveen (1972), The Observer's Fighting Vehicles Directory World War II (in German), London/New York, ISBN 0-7232-1469-7
- C. H. Wendel (2005), Standard catalog of farm tractors, 1890-1980 (in German) (2 ed.), Iola, WI., ISBN 0-87349-726-0
