= Workforce Strategy Center =

Workforce Strategy Center (WSC) is a nonprofit organization that works with federal, state and local workforce development and economic development agencies and community colleges to align policies and practices to help workers advance in a changing economy. The organization focuses on working with other entities to transition workers displaced from their previous jobs into new careers.

The WSC were involved in the Career Pathways model, a framework for career advancement, for which they have been credited as one of the "major players". Other work includes the 2001 coauthored The Case For Community Colleges: Aligning Higher Education and Workforce Needs in Massachusetts, recommending significant changes to community colleges.
