= Agency for the Consolidation of Technology in Education =

Gabon-based non-governmental organization

Agency for the Consolidation of Technology in Education or ACTE is a non-governmental organization created in 2005, promoting the use of ICT or Information and Communication Technologies in education, particularly in sciences. Based in Libreville, Gabon, ACTE's biggest sponsor is French oil partner, Total Gabon, supported through its initiative for local education and training development. The ngo's most notable work involves creating high-technology computer centers inside high schools called ‘Centers of Excellence’. To date, ACTE has set up a ‘Center of Excellence’ in the towns of Libreville, Port Gentil, and Essasa.

ACTE was founded by Yoan E. Anguilet, Gabon's first winner of former President Omar Bongo’s country-wide scholarship competition in 1997. He later went on to earn a BS in Electrical Engineering & Computer Science from MIT in 2002, and an Ed.M from Harvard’s School of Education in 2004. While at MIT, Yoan’s work on a virtual learning application (NKOMA) won the school’s Arnold Nylander Award for Best Advanced Undergraduate Project in EECS. NKOMA is heavily used as a ‘virtual science lab’ and ‘audiovisual lab’ within ACTE's education activities.
