= Triple mix =

Triple mix is a mixture of three equal parts of topsoil, peat, and compost. It is commercially sold as a means to amend a variety of poor soil conditions. Generally used for establishing or maintaining lawns and gardens.
