= Adaptive compliant trailing edge =

Research project on aircraft wing design

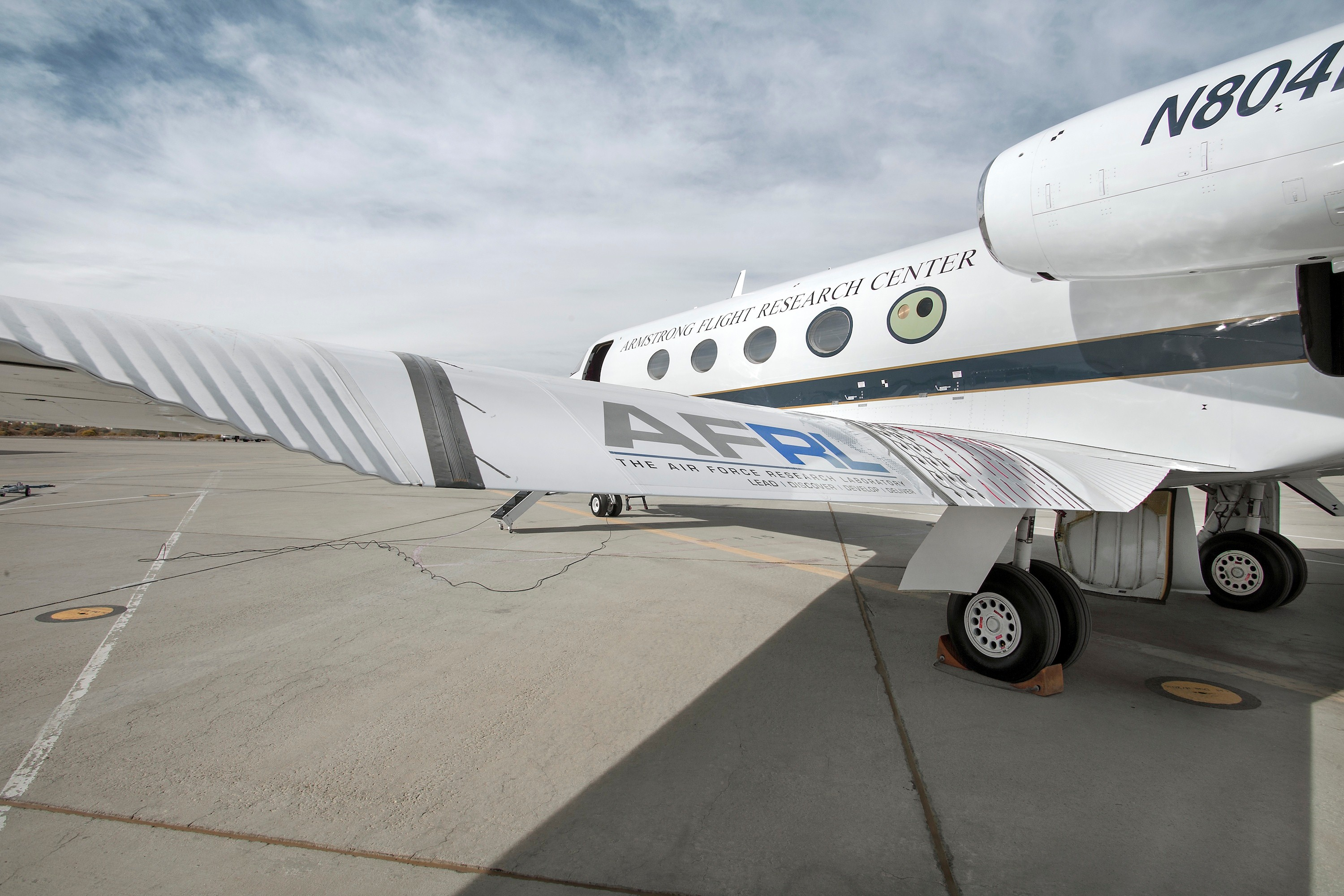
Test aircraft with ACTE flaps. The flap itself (here extended to 20 degrees deflection) is smoothly bendable and does not open gaps in the wing surface. Also the two triangular gaps between the flaps and the fixed wing are bridged by flexible material.

Adaptive Compliant Trailing Edge (ACTE) is a research project on shape-changing flaps for aircraft wings, intended to reduce the aircraft's fuel costs and reduce noise during take-off and landing. It is a join effort by NASA and the U.S. Air Force Research Laboratory and first airborne tests have been conducted in late 2014.

ACTE flaps close the gaps present in conventional flaps using flexible material, generating a continuous bendable surface. As of 2015 enhanced hinged wing flaps (which fold out from under the wing's trailing edge and are used on most jets) are studied. A Gulfstream III business aircraft of the AFRL has been equipped with flaps from FlexSys Inc. and is performing airborne flight tests since 7 November 2014. FlexSys Inc., a company founded by Prof. Kota in 2000, is dedicated to develop the concept of a flexible aircraft wing and received US$40 million in financial assistance from the Air Force's small business innovation research program. According to FlexSys the technology helps in fuel savings of 4% to 12% and noise reduction during takeoff and landing by up to 40%.

== See also ==
- Aircraft flight control system
