= Dump truck =

Truck which can tip its bed, dumping its contents

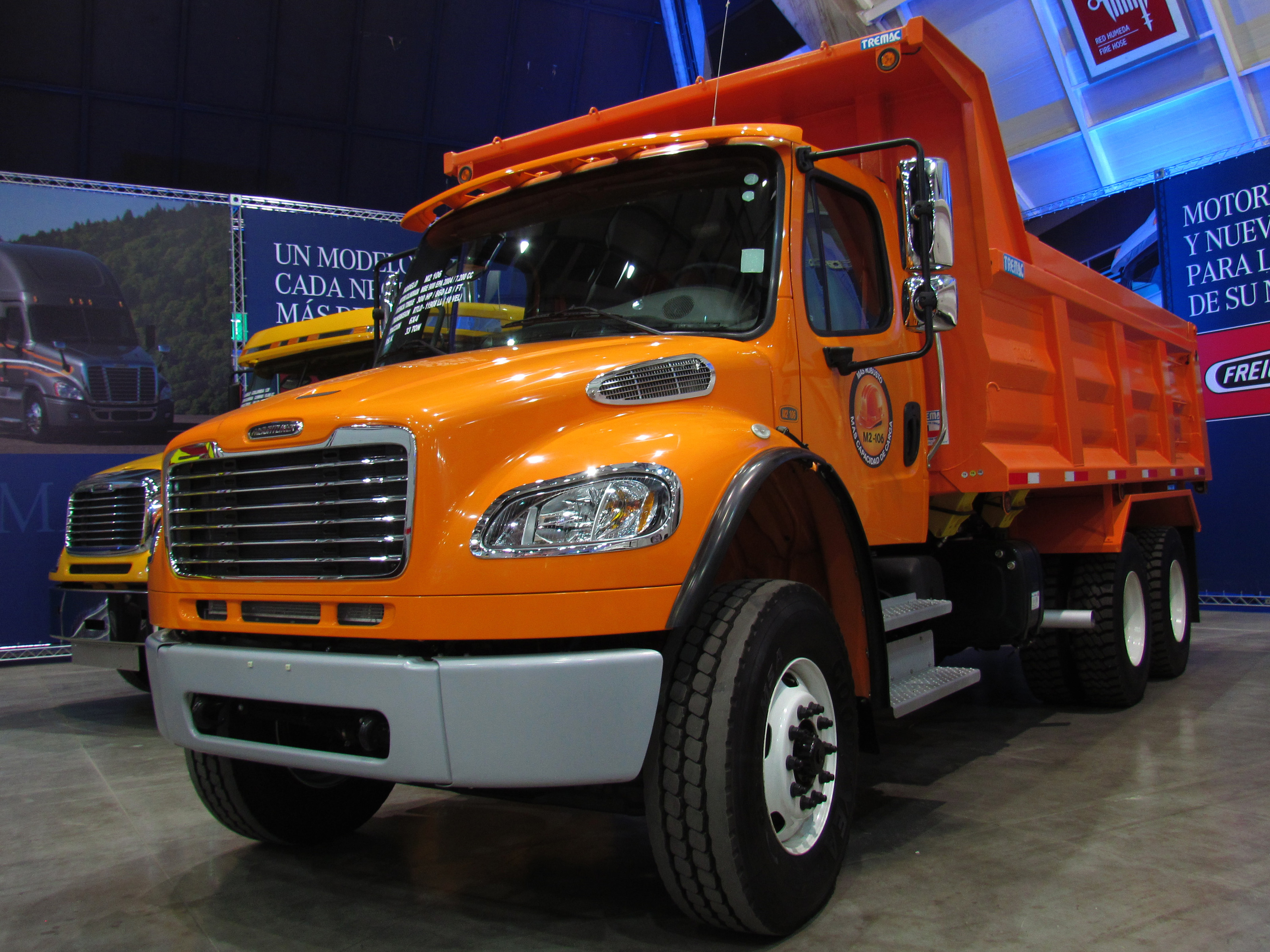
Freightliner Business Class M2 Dump Truck

A dump truck, known also as a dumping truck, dump lorry or dumper lorry or a dumper for short, is used for transporting materials (such as dirt, gravel, or demolition waste) for construction as well as coal. A typical dump truck is equipped with an open-box bed, which is hinged at the rear and equipped with hydraulic rams to lift the front, allowing the material in the bed to be deposited ("dumped") on the ground behind the truck at the site of delivery. In the UK, Australia, South Africa and India the term applies to off-road construction plants only and the road vehicle is known as a tip lorry, tipper lorry (UK, India), tipper truck, tip truck, tip trailer or tipper trailer or simply a tipper (Australia, New Zealand, South Africa).

== History ==
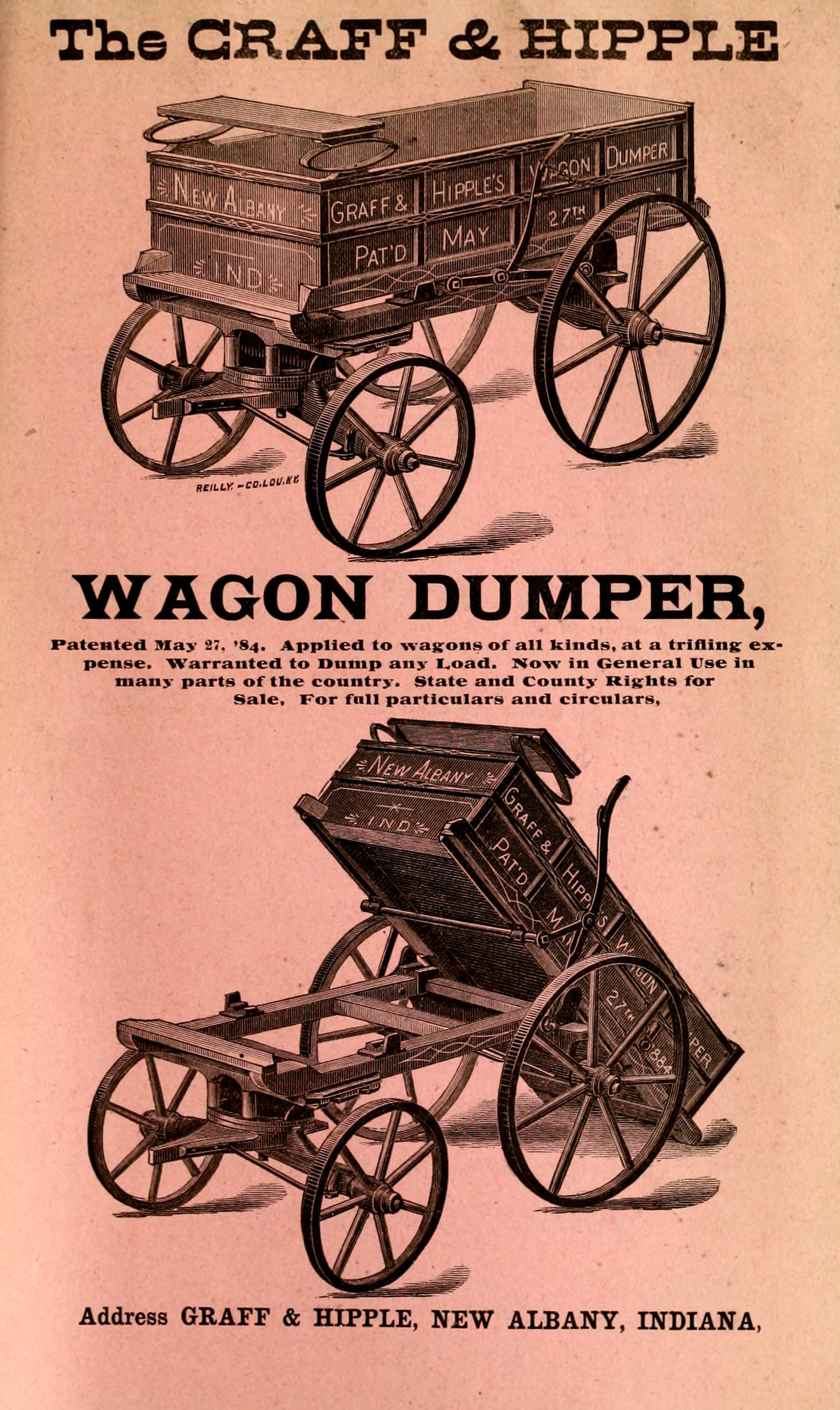
The Graff & Hipple Wagon Dumper, c. 1884, showing an early lever-based dumping mechanism

The dump truck is thought to have been first conceived in the farms of late 19th-century western Europe. Thornycroft developed a steam dust-cart in 1896 with a tipper mechanism. The first motorized dump trucks in the United States were developed by small equipment companies such as The Fruehauf Trailer Corporation, Galion Buggy Co. and Lauth-Juergens among many others around 1910. Hydraulic dump beds were introduced by Wood Hoist Co. shortly after. Such companies flourished during World War I due to massive wartime demand. August Fruehauf had obtained military contracts for his semi-trailer, invented in 1914 and later created the partner vehicle, the semi-truck for use in World War I. After the war, Fruehauf introduced hydraulics in his trailers. They offered hydraulic lift gates, hydraulic winches and a dump trailer for sale in the early 1920s. Fruehauf became the premier supplier of dump trailers and their famed "bathtub dump" was considered to be the best by heavy haulers, road and mining construction firms.

Companies like Galion Buggy Co. continued to grow after the war by manufacturing a number of express bodies and some smaller dump bodies that could be easily installed on either stock or converted (heavy-duty suspension and drivetrain) Model T chassis before 1920. Galion and Wood Mfg. Co. built all of the dump bodies offered by Ford on their heavy-duty AA and BB chassis during the 1930s. Galion (now Galion Godwin Truck Body Co.) is the oldest known truck body manufacturer still in operation today.

The first known Canadian dump truck was developed in Saint John, New Brunswick, when Robert T. Mawhinney attached a dump box to a flatbed truck in 1920. The lifting device was a winch attached to a cable that fed over a sheave (pulley) mounted on a mast behind the cab. The cable was connected to the lower front end of the wooden dump box which was attached by a pivot at the back of the truck frame. The operator turned a crank to raise and lower the box.

From the 1930s Euclid, International-Harvester and Mack contributed to ongoing development. Mack modified its existing trucks with varying success. In 1934 Euclid became the first manufacturer in the world to successfully produce a dedicated off-highway truck.

A dump truck with continuous track wheels crosses a river and dumps its load in Kanagawa, Japan

== Types ==
Today, virtually all dump trucks operate by hydraulics and they come in a variety of configurations each designed to accomplish a specific task in the construction material supply chain.

=== Standard dump truck ===
A standard dump truck is a truck chassis with a dump body mounted to the frame. The bed is raised by a vertical hydraulic ram mounted under the front of the body (known as a front post hoist configuration), or a horizontal hydraulic ram and lever arrangement between the frame rails (known as an underbody hoist configuration), and the back of the bed is hinged at the back of the truck. The tailgate (sometimes referred to as an end gate) can be configured to swing up on top hinges (and sometimes also to fold down on lower hinges) or it can be configured in the "High Lift Tailgate" format wherein pneumatic or hydraulic rams lift the gate open and up above the dump body. Some bodies, typically for hauling grain, have swing-out doors for entering the box and a metering gate/chute in the center for a more controlled dumping.

In the United States most standard dump trucks have one front steering axle and one (4x2 (Note: Number of wheels × number of powered wheels, with dual tires counted as a single wheel.) 4-wheeler) or two (6x4 6-wheeler) rear axles which typically have dual wheels on each side. Tandem rear axles are almost always powered, (Note: Some very heavy-duty trucks have a "tridem" with 3 powered axles.) front steering axles are also sometimes powered (4x4, 6x6). Unpowered axles are sometimes used to support extra weight. (Note: Dump trucks are usually used locally, and are only subject to state limits, which can be heavier than interstate limits) Most unpowered rear axles can be raised off the ground to minimize wear when the truck is empty or lightly loaded, and are commonly called "lift axles" or “pusher axles.” The most commonly found Class 8 dump truck models are the Kenworth T800 and T880, Peterbilt 367 and 567, Western Star 4700, 4900, 47X and 49X, Volvo VHD, Freightliner 114SD and 122SD, and Mack Granite.

European Union heavy trucks often have two steering axles. Dump truck configurations are two, three, and four axles. The four-axle eight wheeler has two steering axles at the front and two powered axles at the rear and is limited to 32 metric tons (35 short tons; 31 long tons) gross weight in most EU countries. The largest of the standard European dump trucks is commonly called a "centipede" and has seven axles. The front axle is the steering axle, the rear two axles are powered, and the remaining four are lift axles.

The shorter wheelbase of a standard dump truck often makes it more maneuverable than the higher capacity semi-trailer dump trucks.

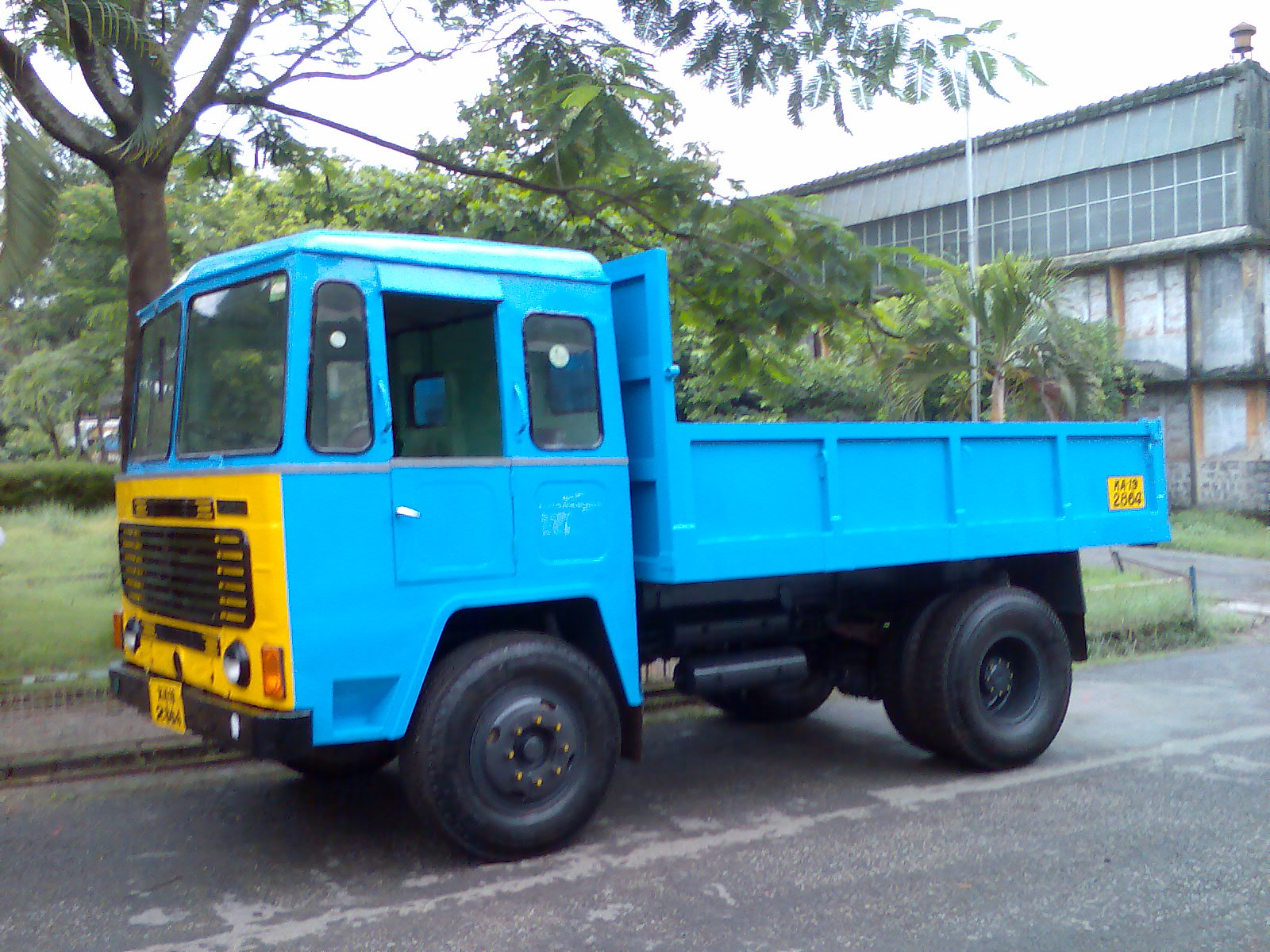
An Ashok Leyland Comet dump truck, an example of a very basic 4×2 dump truck used for payloads of 10 metric tons (11.0 short tons; 9.8 long tons) or less

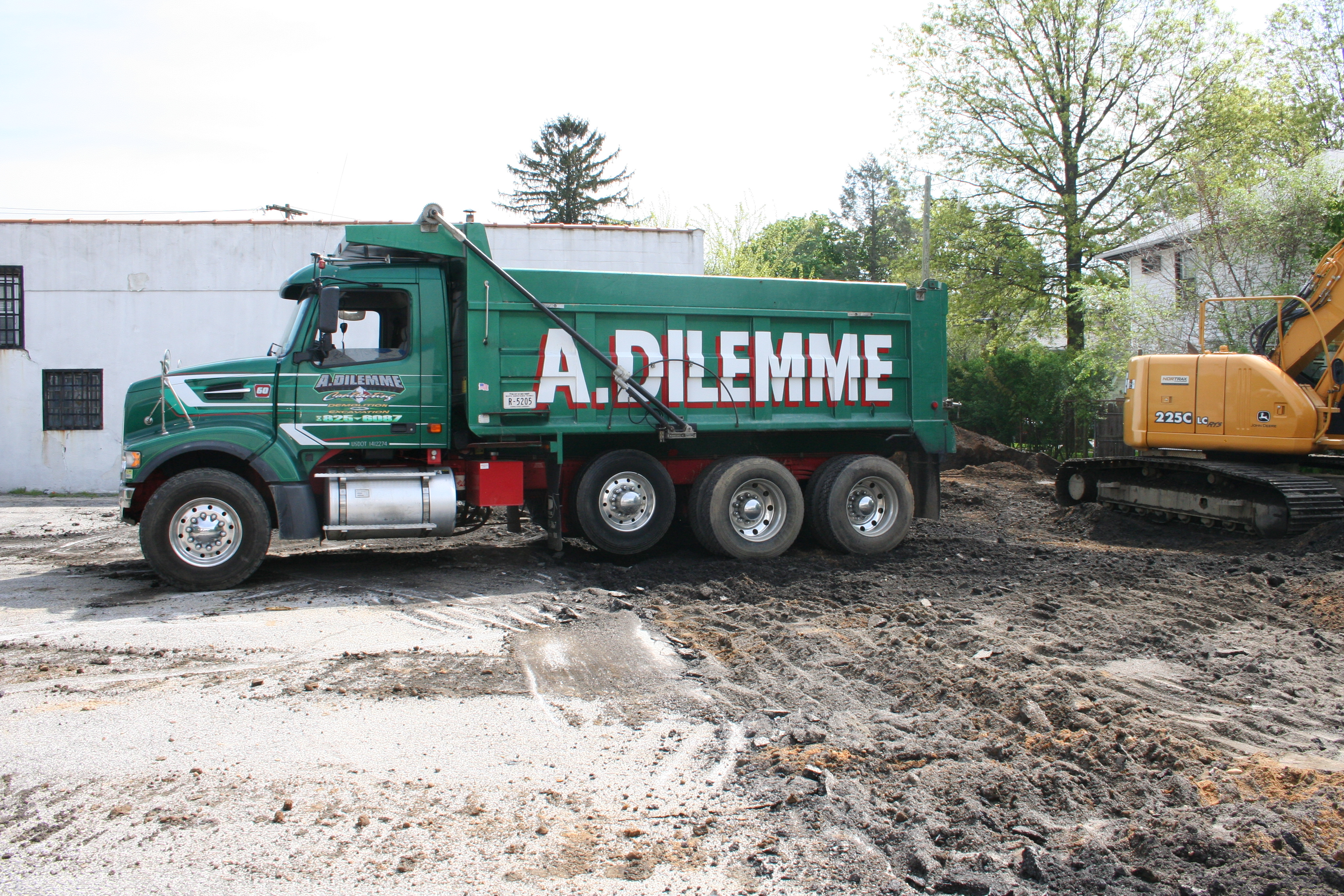
US 4-axle with lift axle

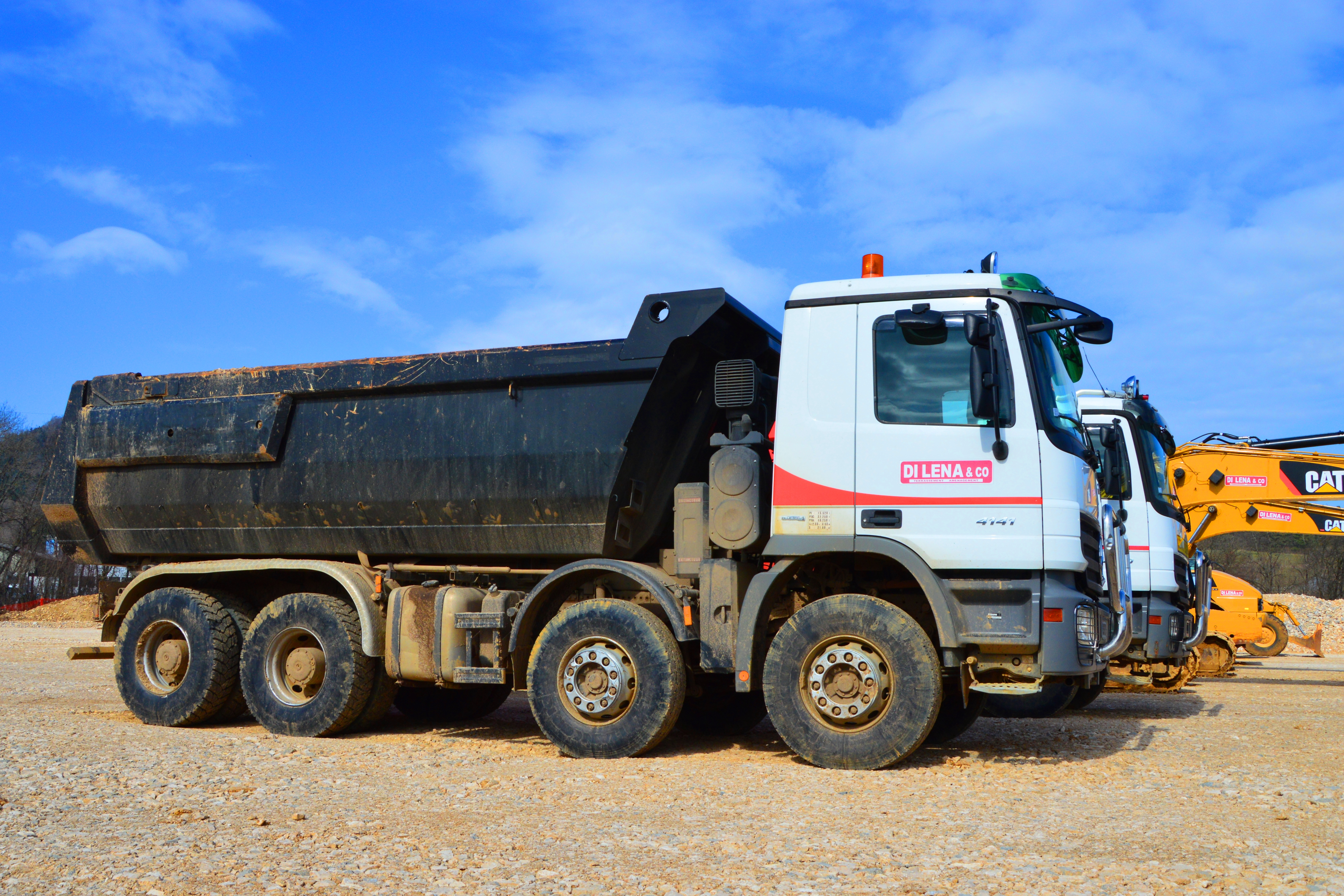
EU four-axle with two steering axles

=== Semi trailer end dump truck ===
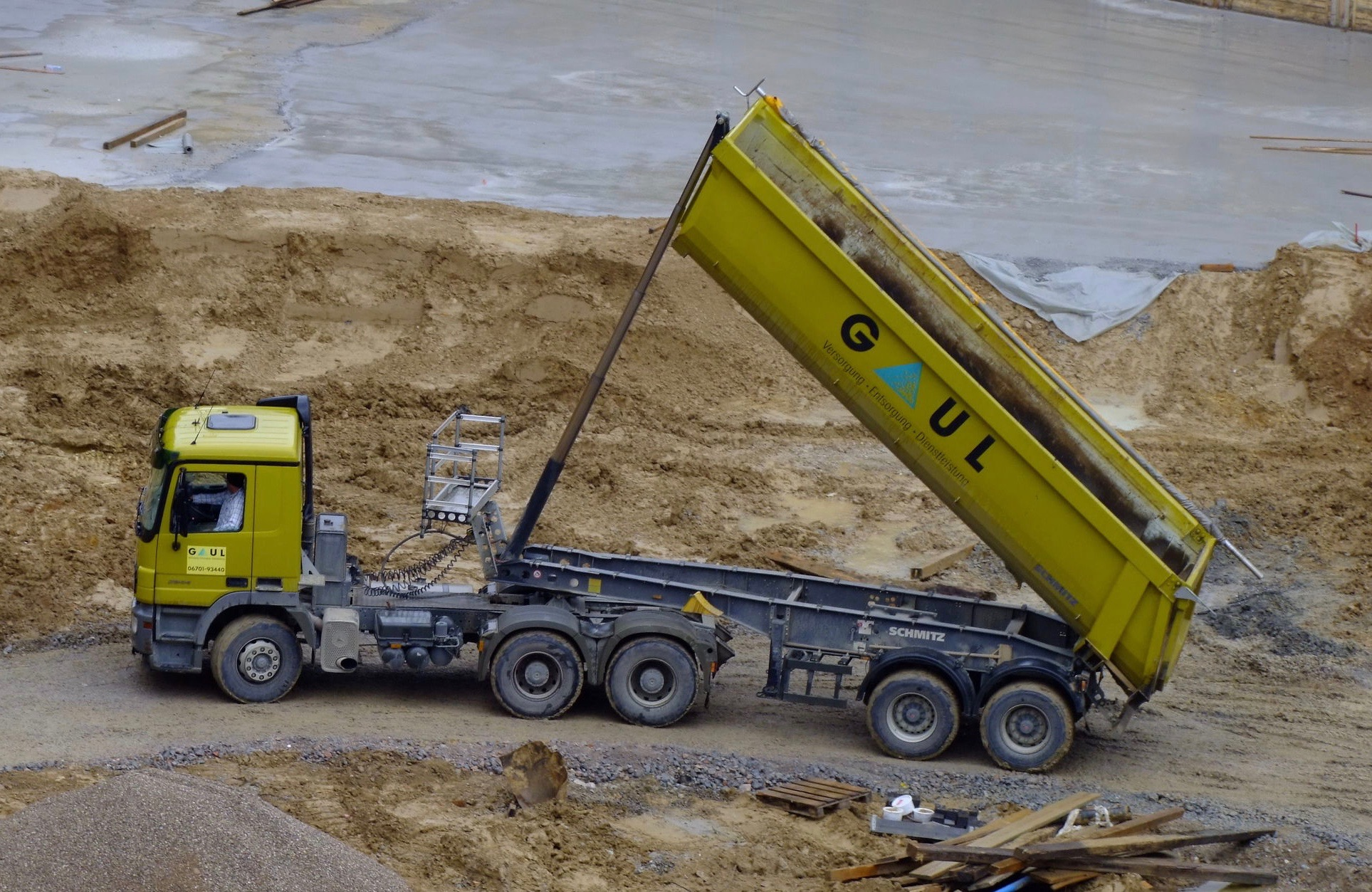
6×4 semi-tractor with two-axle trailer

A semi end dump is a tractor-trailer combination wherein the trailer itself contains the hydraulic hoist. In the US a typical semi end dump has a 3-axle tractor pulling a 2-axle trailer with dual tires; in the EU trailers often have 3 axles and single tires. The key advantage of a semi end dump is a large payload. A key disadvantage is that they are very unstable when raised in the dumping position limiting their use in many applications where the dumping location is uneven or off level. Some end dumps make use of an articulated arm (known as a stabilizer) below the box, between the chassis rails, to stabilize the load in the raised position.

Frame and Frameless end dump truck

Depending on the structure, a semi-trailer end dump truck can also be divided into a frame trailer and a frameless trailer.

The main difference between them is the structure. The frame dump trailer has a large beam that runs along the bottom of the trailer to support it. The frameless dump trailer has no frame under the trailer but has ribs that go around the body for support and the top rail of the trailer serves as a suspension bridge for support.

The difference in structure also brings with it a difference in weight. Frame dump trailers are heavier. For the same length, a frame dump trailer weighs around 5 ton more than a frameless dump trailer.

=== Transfer dump truck ===
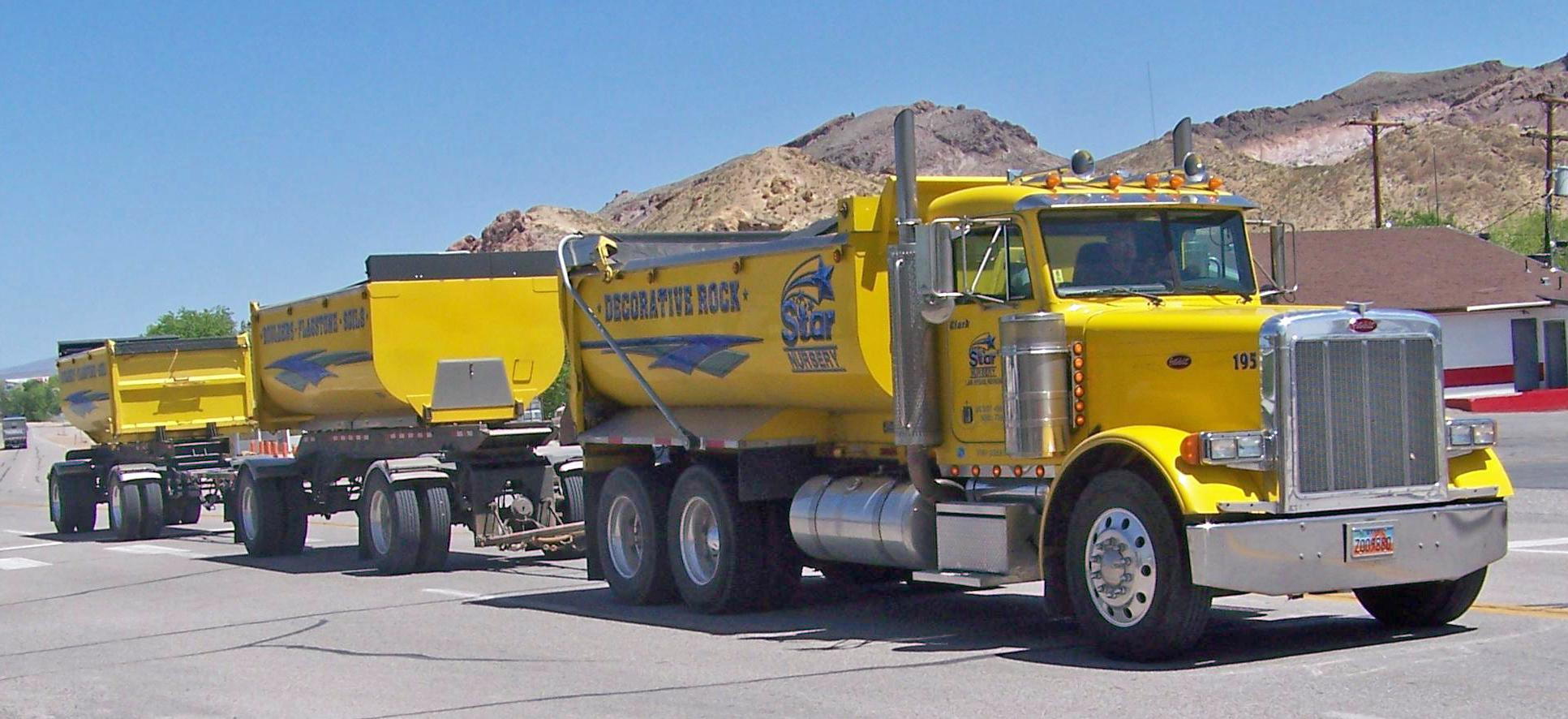
Example of a transfer truck and two trailers

A transfer dump truck is a standard dump truck pulling a separate trailer with a movable cargo container, which can also be loaded with construction aggregate, gravel, sand, asphalt, klinkers, snow, wood chips, triple mix, etc.

The second aggregate container on the trailer ("B" box), is powered by an electric motor, a pneumatic motor or a hydraulic line. It rolls on small wheels, riding on rails from the trailer's frame into the empty main dump container ("A" box). This maximizes payload capacity without sacrificing the maneuverability of the standard dump truck. Transfer dump trucks are typically seen in the western United States due to the peculiar weight restrictions on highways there.

Another configuration is called a triple transfer train, consisting of a "B" and "C" box. These are common on Nevada and Utah Highways, but not in California. Depending on the axle arrangement, a triple transfer can haul up to 129,000 kilograms (284,000 pounds) with a special permit in certain American states. As of 2007, a triple transfer costs a contractor about $105 an hour, while an A/B configuration costs about $85 per hour.

Transfer dump trucks typically haul between 26 and 27 short tons (23.6 and 24.5 t; 23.2 and 24.1 long tons) of aggregate per load; each truck is capable of 3–5 loads per day, generally speaking.

=== Truck and pup ===
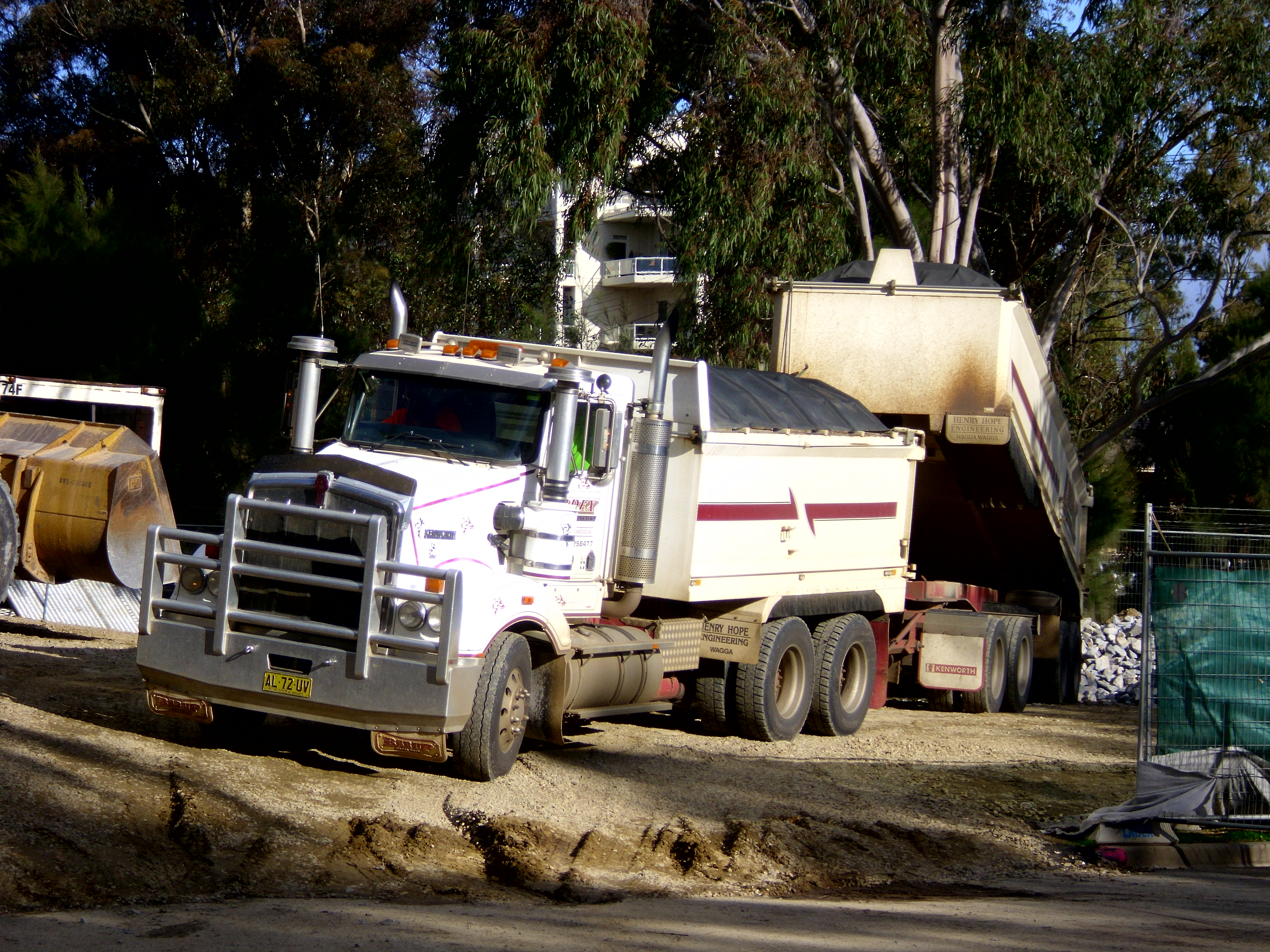
Truck and pup dump truck

A truck and pup is very similar to a transfer dump. It consists of a standard dump truck pulling a dump trailer. The pup trailer, unlike the transfer, has its own hydraulic ram and is capable of self-unloading.

=== Superdump truck ===
Fruehauf super dump with GMC tractor

A super dump is a straight dump truck equipped with a trailing axle, a liftable, load-bearing axle rated as high as 13,000 pounds (5,897 kg). Trailing 11 to 13 feet (3.35 to 3.96 m) behind the rear tandem, the trailing axle stretches the outer "bridge" measurement—the distance between the first and last axles—to the maximum overall length allowed. This increases the gross weight allowed under the federal bridge formula, which sets standards for truck size and weight. Depending on the vehicle length and axle configuration, Superdumps can be rated as high as 80,000 pounds (36,287 kg) GVW and carry 26 short tons (23.6 t; 23.2 long tons) of payload or more. When the truck is empty or ready to offload, the trailing axle toggles up off the road surface on two hydraulic arms to clear the rear of the vehicle. Truck owners call their trailing axle-equipped trucks Superdumps because they far exceed the payload, productivity, and return on investment of a conventional dump truck. The Superdump and trailing axle concept were developed by Strong Industries of Houston, Texas.

=== Semi trailer bottom dump truck ===
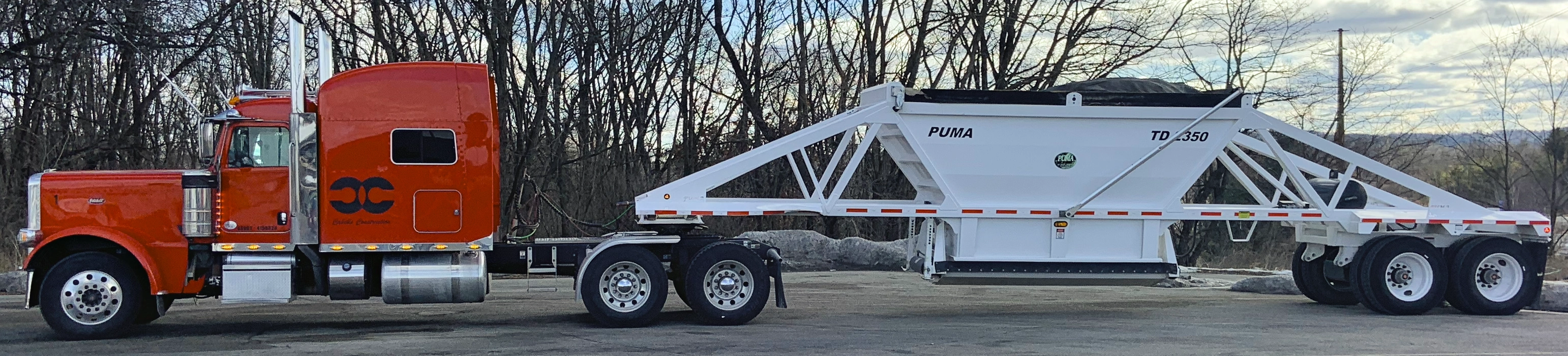
Semi trailer bottom dump truck

A semi bottom dump, bottom hopper, or belly dump is a (commonly) 3-axle tractor pulling a 2-axle trailer with a clam shell type dump gate in the belly of the trailer. The key advantage of a semi bottom dump is its ability to lay material in a windrow, a linear heap. In addition, a semi bottom dump is maneuverable in reverse, unlike the double and triple trailer configurations described below. These trailers may be found either of the windrow type shown in the photo or may be of the cross spread type, with the gate opening front to rear instead of left and right. The cross-spread type gate will actually spread the cereal grains fairly and evenly from the width of the trailer. By comparison, the windrow-type gate leaves a pile in the middle. The cross-spread type gate, on the other hand, tends to jam and may not work very well with coarse materials.

=== Double and triple trailer bottom dump truck ===
Double and triple bottom dumps consist of a 2-axle tractor pulling one single-axle semi-trailer and an additional full trailer (or two full trailers in the case of triples). These dump trucks allow the driver to lay material in windrows without leaving the cab or stopping the truck. The main disadvantage is the difficulty in backing double and triple units.

The specific type of dump truck used in any specific country is likely to be closely keyed to the weight and axle limitations of that jurisdiction. Rock, dirt, and other types of materials commonly hauled in trucks of this type are quite heavy, and almost any style of truck can be easily overloaded. Because of that, this type of truck is frequently configured to take advantage of local weight limitations to maximize the cargo. For example, within the United States, the maximum weight limit is 40 short tons (36.3 t; 35.7 long tons) throughout the country, except for specific bridges with lower limits. Individual states, in some instances, are allowed to authorize trucks up to 52.5 short tons (47.6 t; 46.9 long tons). Most states that do so require that the trucks be very long, to spread the weight over more distance. It is in this context that double and triple bottoms are found within the United States.

=== Bumper Pull Dump Trailer ===
Bumper Pull personal and commercial Dump Trailers come in a variety of sizes from smaller 6x10 7,000 GVWR models to larger 7x16 High Side 14,000 GVWR models.

Dump trailers come with a range of options and features such as tarp kits, high side options, dump/spread/swing gates, remote control, scissor, telescope, dual or single cylinder lifts, and metal locking toolboxes. They can be used for a variety of applications, including roofing, rock and mulch delivery, general contractors, skid steer grading, trash out, and recycling.

=== Side dump truck ===
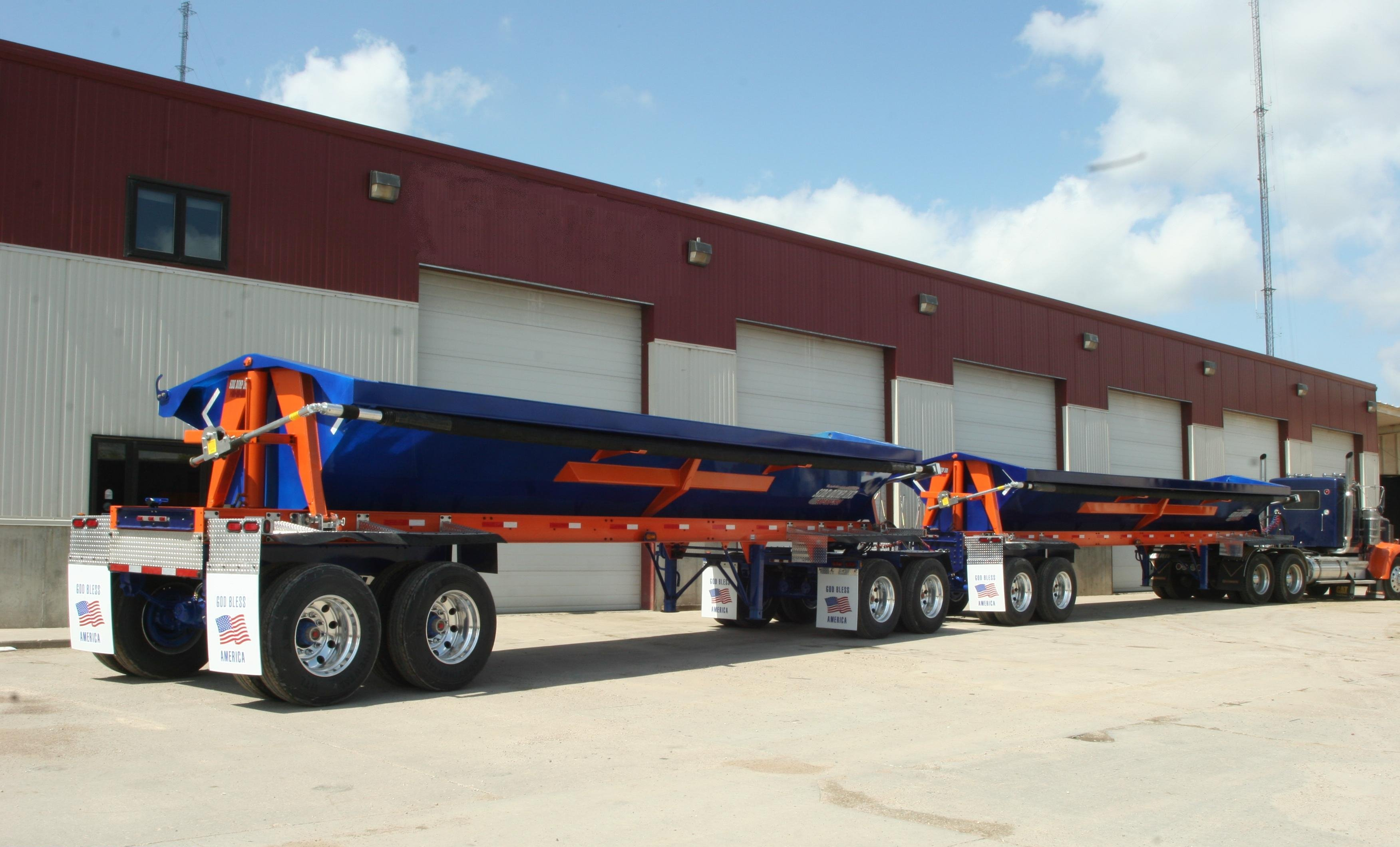
Side Dump Industries Train Set

A side dump truck (SDT) consists of a 3-axle tractor pulling a 2-axle semi-trailer. It has hydraulic rams that tilt the dump body onto its side, spilling the material to either the left or right side of the trailer. The key advantages of the side dump are that it allows rapid unloading and can carry more weight in the western United States. In addition, it is almost immune to upset (tipping over) while dumping, unlike the semi end dumps which are very prone to tipping over. It is, however, highly likely that a side dump trailer will tip over if dumping is stopped prematurely. Also, when dumping loose materials or cobble sized stone, the side dump can become stuck if the pile becomes wide enough to cover too much of the trailer's wheels. Trailers that dump at the appropriate angle (50° for example) avoid the problem of the dumped load fouling the path of the trailer wheels by dumping their loads further to the side of the truck, in some cases leaving sufficient clearance to walk between the dumped load and the trailer.

=== Winter service vehicles ===
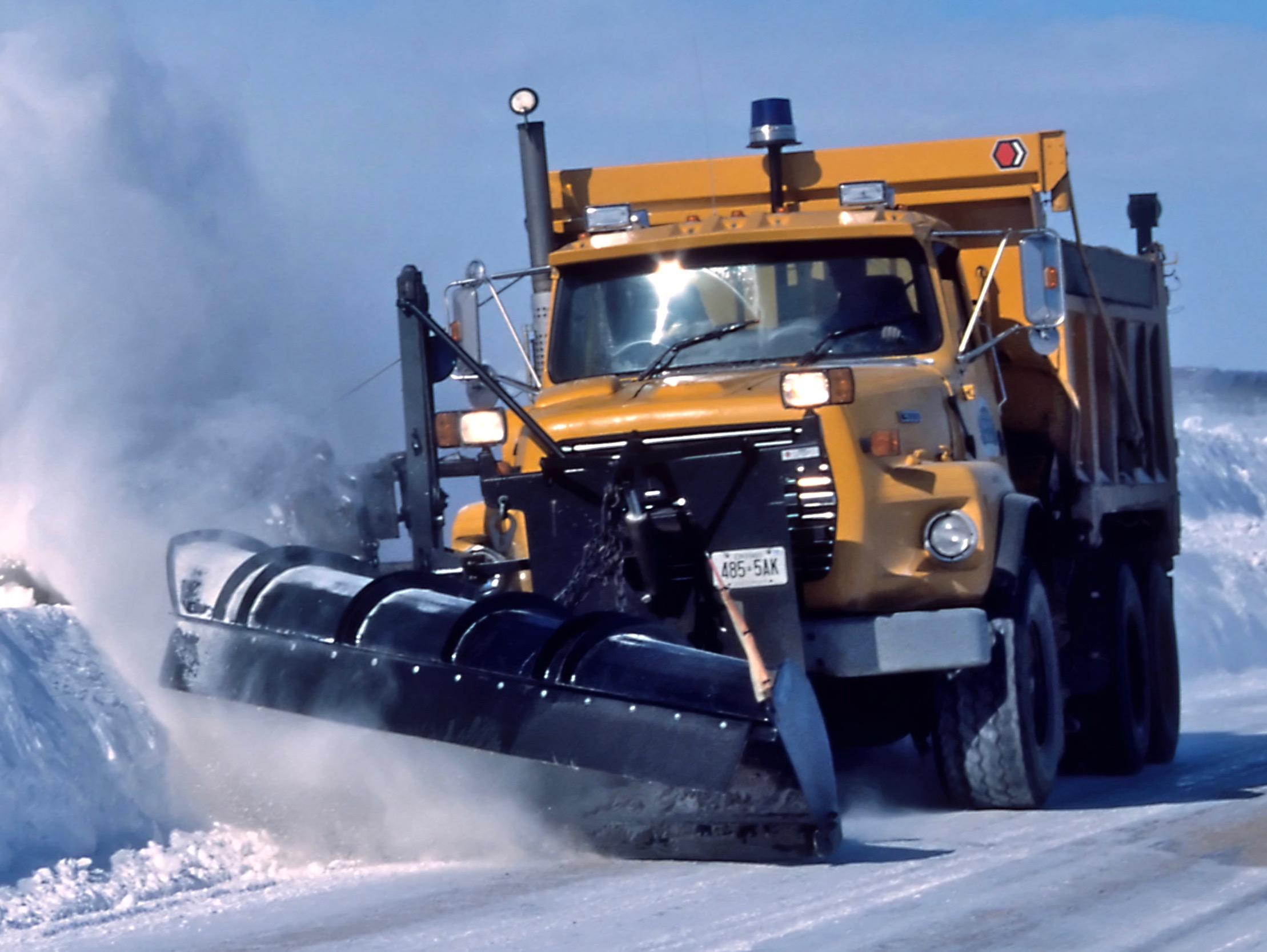
Dump truck with snowplow

Many winter service vehicles are based on dump trucks, to allow the placement of ballast to weigh the truck down or to hold sodium or calcium chloride salts for spreading on snow and ice-covered surfaces. Plowing is severe service and needs heavy-duty trucks.

=== Roll-off trucks ===
A Roll-off has a hoist and subframe, but no body; it carries removable containers. The container is loaded on the ground, then pulled onto the back of the truck with a winch and cable. The truck goes to the dumpsite; after it has been dumped the empty container is taken and placed to be loaded or stored. The hoist is raised and the container slides down the subframe so the rear is on the ground. The container has rollers on the rear and can be moved forward or back until the front of it is lowered onto the ground. The containers are usually open-topped boxes used for rubble and building debris, but rubbish compactor containers are also carried. A newer hook-lift system ("roller container" in the UK) does the same job, but lifts, lowers, and dumps the container with a boom arrangement instead of a cable and hoist.

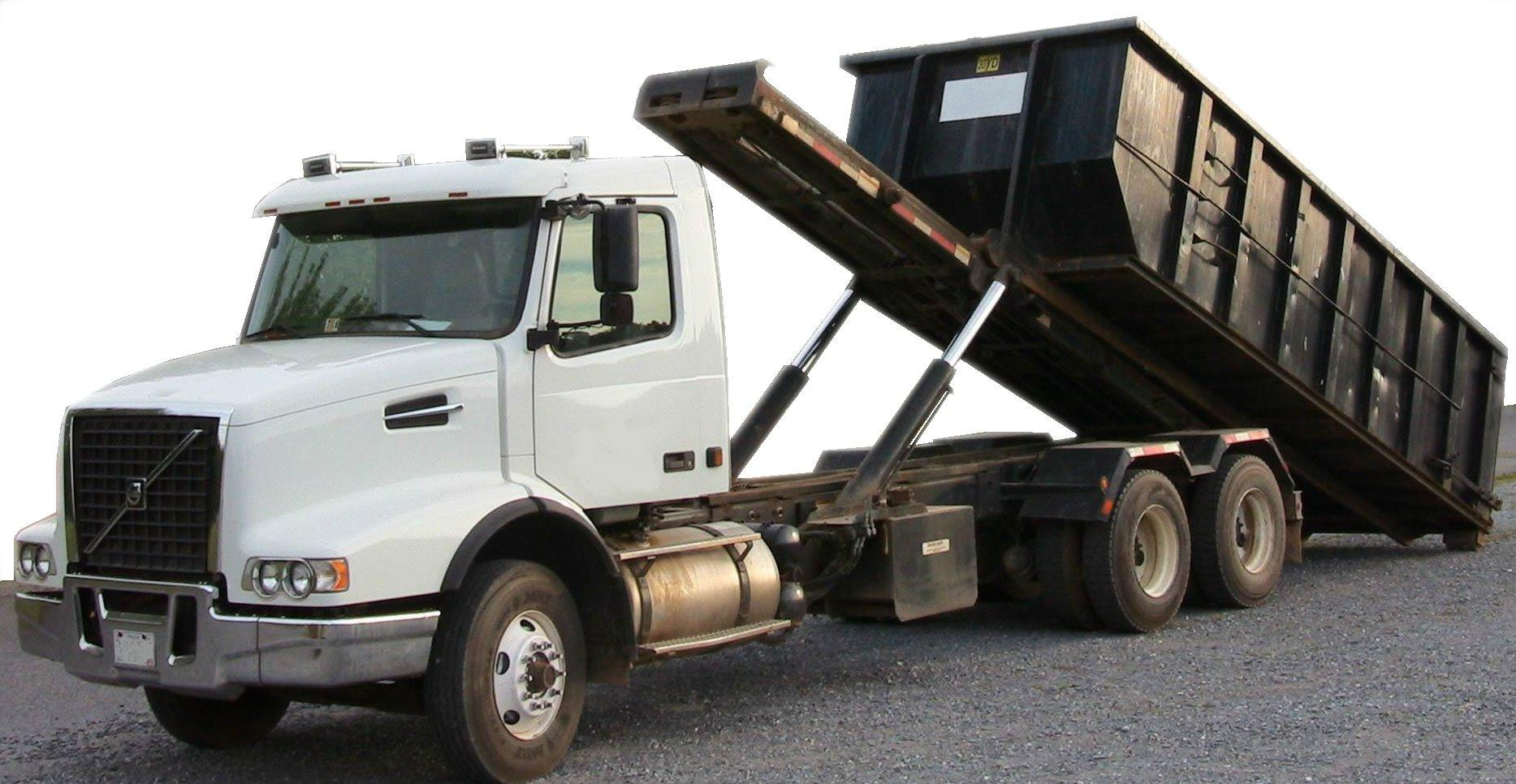
Roll-off with box container

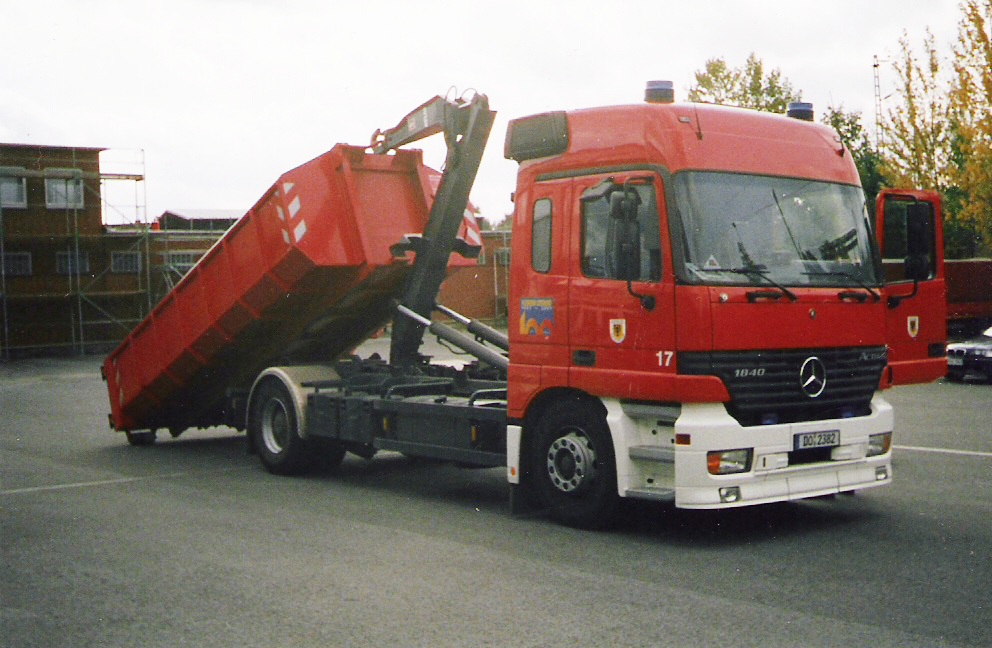
Roller container

=== Off-highway dump trucks ===
Off-highway dump trucks are heavy construction equipment and share little resemblance to highway dump trucks. Bigger off-highway dump trucks are used strictly off-road for mining and heavy dirt hauling jobs. There are two primary forms: rigid frame and articulating frame.

The term "dump" truck is not generally used by the mining industry, or by the manufacturers that build these machines. The more appropriate U.S. term for this strictly off-road vehicle is "haul truck" and the equivalent European term is "dumper".

==== Haul truck ====
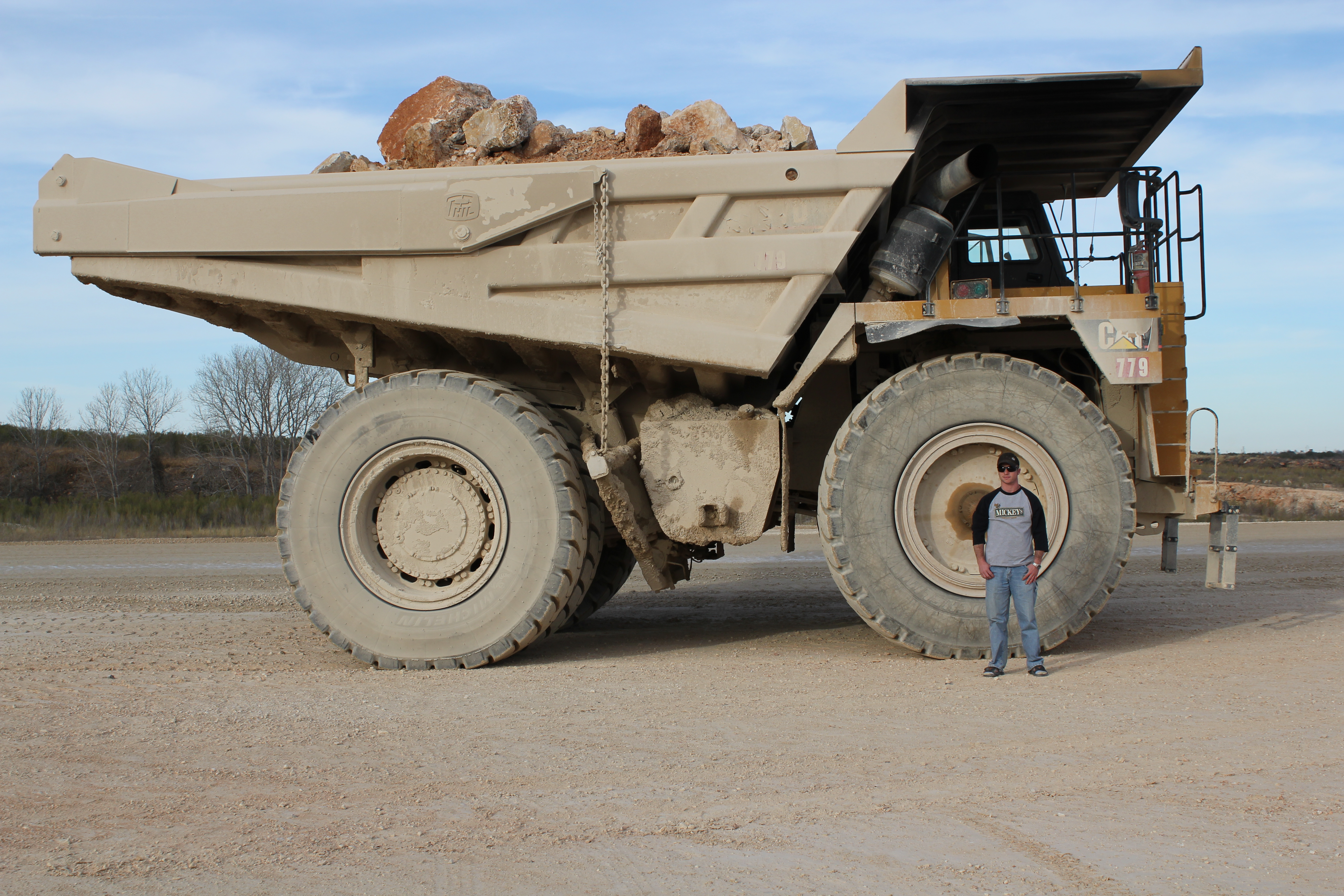
Small 200 Ton Caterpillar Haul truck

Haul trucks are used in large surface mines and quarries. They have a rigid frame and conventional steering with drive at the rear wheel. As of late 2013, the largest ever production haul truck is the 450 metric ton BelAZ 75710, followed by the Liebherr T 282B, the Bucyrus MT6300AC and the Caterpillar 797F, which each have payload capacities of up to 400 short tons (363 t; 357 long tons). The previous record holder was the Canadian-built Terex 33-19 "Titan", having held the record for over 25 years. Most large-size haul trucks employ Diesel-electric powertrains, using the Diesel engine to drive an AC alternator or DC generator that sends electric power to electric motors at each rear wheel. The Caterpillar 797 is unique for its size, as it employs a Diesel engine to power a mechanical powertrain, typical of most road-going vehicles and intermediary-size haul trucks. Other major manufacturers of haul trucks include SANY, XCMG, Hitachi, Komatsu, DAC, Terex, and BelAZ.

==== Articulated hauler ====
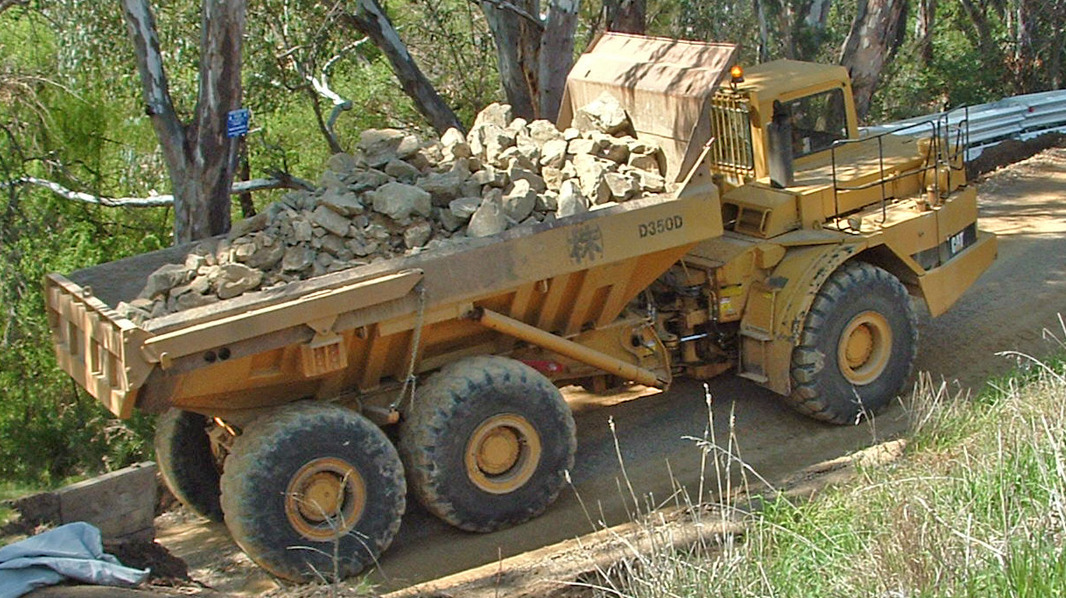
Articulated dump truck or dumper

An articulated dumper is an all-wheel-drive, off-road dump truck. It has a hinge between the cab and the dump box but is distinct from a semi-trailer truck in that the power unit is a permanent fixture, not a separable vehicle. Steering is accomplished via hydraulic cylinders that pivot the entire tractor in relation to the trailer, rather than rack and pinion steering on the front axle as in a conventional dump truck. By this way of steering, the trailer's wheels follow the same path as the front wheels. Together with all-wheel drive and low center of gravity, it is highly adaptable to rough terrain. Major manufacturers include Volvo CE, Terex, John Deere, and Caterpillar.

In 2025, Volvo Construction Equipment introduced the world’s first electric articulated haulers, the Volvo CE A40e and A45e, marking a significant step toward electrification in heavy-duty earthmoving equipment.

=== U-shaped dump truck ===
U-shaped dump trucks, also known as tub-body trucks, are used to transport construction waste. They are made of high-strength super wear-resistant special steel plates directly bent and have the characteristics of impact resistance, alternating stress resistance, corrosion resistance and so on.

1. Cleaner unloading U-shaped dump truck, there is no dead angle at the corners of the cargo box, it is not easy to stick to the box when unloading, and the unloading is cleaner.

2. Lightweight The U-shaped cargo box reduces its own weight through structural optimization. Now the most common U-shaped dump is to use high-strength plates. Under the premise of ensuring the strength of the car body, the thickness of the plate is reduced by about 20%, and the self-weight of the car is reduced by about 1 ton, which effectively improves the utilization factor of the load mass.

3. Strong carrying capacity. Using a high-strength steel plate, high yield strength, better impact resistance and fatigue resistance. For users of ore transportation, it can reduce damage to the container.

4. Low center of gravity. The U-shaped structure has a lower center of gravity, which makes the ride more stable, especially when cornering, and avoids spilling cargo.

5. Save tires The U-shaped cargo box can keep the cargo in the center, and the tires on both sides are more evenly stressed, which is beneficial to improve the life of the tires.

== Dangers ==
=== Collisions ===
Dump trucks are normally built for some amount of off-road or construction site driving; as the driver is protected by the chassis and height of the driver's seat, bumpers are either placed high or omitted for added ground clearance. The disadvantage is that in a collision with a standard car, the entire motor section or luggage compartment goes under the truck. Thus, the passengers in the car could be more severely injured than would be common in a collision with another car. Several countries have made rules that new trucks should have bumpers approximately 40 cm (16 in) above ground in order to protect other drivers. There are also rules about how long the load or construction of the truck can go beyond the rear bumper to prevent cars that rear-end the truck from going under it.

=== Tipping ===
Another safety consideration is the leveling of the truck before unloading. If the truck is not parked on relatively horizontal ground, the sudden change of weight and balance due to lifting of the body and dumping of the material can cause the truck to slide, or even to tip over. The live bottom trailer is an approach to eliminate this danger.

=== Back-up accidents ===
Because of their size and the difficulty of maintaining visual contact with on-foot workers, dump trucks can be a threat, especially when backing up. Mirrors and back-up alarms provide some level of protection, and having a spotter working with the driver also decreases back-up injuries and fatalities.

== Manufacturers ==
- Ashok Leyland
- Asia MotorWorks
- Astra Veicoli Industriali
- BelAZ
- BEML
- Case CE
- Caterpillar Inc.
- DAC
- Daewoo
- Dart
- Eicher Motors
- Euclid Trucks
- FAP
- HEPCO
- Hitachi Construction Machinery
- Hitachi Construction Machinery (Europe)
- Iveco
- John Deere
- Kamaz
- Kenworth
- Kioleides
- Komatsu
- KrAZ
- Leader Trucks
- Liebherr Group
- Mack Trucks
- Mahindra Trucks & Buses Ltd.
- MAN SE
- Mercedes-Benz
- Navistar International
- New Holland
- Peterbilt
- SANY
- Scania AB
- ST Kinetics
- Tata
- Tatra
- Terex Corporation
- Volvo Construction Equipment
- Volvo Trucks
- XCMG

== See also ==
- Cement mixer truck
- Road roller
- Combine harvester
- Tractor
- Crane construction (truck)
- Bulldozer
- Forklift
- Dumper
- Garbage truck
- Live bottom trailer
- Rear-eject haul truck bodies
