= Operating capacity =

Operating capacity, or rated operating capacity (ROC), has to do with the calculated tipping load. The capacity (load) that one can safely pick-up and operate without flipping or nose-diving the equipment. Not to be confused with Operating weight.

The definitive range of operating capacity is the asset within which a company hopes to operate—commonly during a short-term period.
