= Accredited Crane Operator Certification =

US certification

Accredited Crane Operator Certification OSHA regulation 29 CFR 1926 Subpart CC, released August 9, 2010, requires crane operators involved in construction to be certified by an accredited certification provider by November 10, 2014. An operator is defined as any person operating the equipment. To be accredited, certification providers must be accredited by a nationally recognized accrediting agency, defined as "an organization that, due to its independence and expertise, is widely recognized as competent to accredit testing organizations. Examples of such accrediting agencies include, but are not limited to, the National Commission for Certifying Agencies and the American National Standards Institute." This is the first time certification by an accredited certification provider has been required on a national level, although individual states (e.g., West Virginia, Hawaii, California) and cities (Chicago, New York, and Philadelphia) have required crane operator certification as far back as 2000. The new OSHA standards make the completion of this requirement an important topic of knowledge for the crane and lifting industry.

== History ==
- 1971 – OSHA passes 29 CFR 1926.550, which is the standard for cranes and derricks used in construction for the next 41 years.
- 1995 – The National Commission for the Certification of Crane Operators (NCCCO) is established by the crane and lifting industry as a nonprofit organization to develop a certification program for crane operators.
- 1998 – NCCCO Mobile Crane Operator certification program is nationally accredited by the National Commission for Certifying Agencies (NCCA).
- 1999 – The Advisory Committee on Construction Safety and Health (ACCSH) recommended that OSHA propose a new rule for cranes and derricks.^{[2]}
- 1999 – There are 110 crane-related accidents with 51 deaths.
- 1999 – NCCCO crane certification is recognized by OSHA and previously by ANSI.
- 2003 – The Cranes and Derricks Negotiated Rulemaking Committee (C-DAC) began writing the new OSHA rule.^{[2]}
- 2003 – There are 269 crane-related accidents with 138 deaths.^{[3]}
- 2004 – The Cranes and Derricks Negotiated Rulemaking Committee (C-DAC) finished the first proposed draft of the new rule.^{[2]}
- 2004 – There are 287 crane-related accidents with 142 deaths.^{[3]}
- 2004 - The Operating Engineers Certification Program (OECP) receives national accreditation from the National Commission for Certifying Agencies (NCCA) begins certifying eligible members of the International Union of Operating Engineers (IUOE)
- 2008 – OSHA's proposed new rule is published and open for public debate.^{[2]}
- 2008 – There are 401 crane-related accidents with 217 deaths.^{[3]}
- 2010 – Final rule is published as OSHA regulation 29 CFR 1926 Subpart CC, Cranes and Derricks in Construction.
- 2010 – NCCER certification is recognized by OSHA and previously by ANSI.
- 2014 – November 10 deadline for crane operators involved in construction to be certified.
- 2015 - November 10, 2014, deadline for crane operators to be certified extended until November 10, 2017.
- 2017 - Electrical Industry Certifications Association receives accreditation from American National Standards Institute (ANSI)

== OSHA Regulation 1926.1427: Operator Qualification and Certification ==
According to the new OSHA regulation, employers are now responsible for ensuring the qualification and certification of any operators on their job site. It states, "The employer must ensure that ... the operator is qualified or certified to operate the equipment." Employers are also responsible to provide the certification at no cost to the operators. This new emphasis on qualification and certification has created a large need in the industry to be filled by various certifying companies.

== 1926.1427(b): Certification by an accredited crane operator testing organization ==
Organizations that offer certification must meet a number of guidelines established by OSHA. One of the main requirements for certifying organizations is that they be accredited by a "nationally recognized accrediting agency." The two main accrediting agencies used in this process are the National Commission for Certifying Agencies (NCCA) and the American National Standards Institute (ANSI). NCCA was the first certifying agency to grant accreditation for crane and rigging personnel. It is the oldest provider of certification tests in the USA. ANSI is the other nationally recognized accrediting organization; ANSI also internationally accredits personnel certification programs to ISO 17024 (General Requirements for Bodies Operating Certification Systems of Persons). ANSI provides 45 personnel accreditation's across multiple industries.

== Certification organizations ==
A number of organizations have been recognized by OSHA for offering certification in the crane and lifting industry. These organizations include the not-for-profit organizations National Center for Construction Education and Research (NCCER), the National Commission for the Certification of Crane Operators (NCCCO), and the Operating Engineers Certification Program (OECP).

== Certification process ==
Operators attempting to gain certification must pass both a written and practical examination. These tests must also be routinely audited for the certifying agencies to maintain their accreditation. OSHA regulation 1926.1427(j) describes the standards both the written and practical tests must meet. However, these tests will greatly vary depending on which organization administers them.
