= Association for Career and Technical Education =

Nonprofitable organization in Alexandria, United States

- Website: https://www.acteonline.org

The Association for Career and Technical Education (ACTE) is the largest national education association in the United States dedicated to the advancement of education that prepares for careers. The ACTE is committed to enhancing the job performance and satisfaction of its members; to increasing public awareness and appreciation for career and technical education (CTE); and to assuring growth in local, state and federal funding for these programs by communicating and working with legislators and government leaders.

== History ==
The Association for Career and Technical Education (ACTE) was founded in 1926 with the name "American Vocational Association".(AVA). The federal government began funding vocational education through the Smith-Hughes Act of 1917. The Smith-Hughes Act marked the significant federal investment in secondary vocational education, focusing on agriculture, home-making, and trade and industrial education. AVA was originally created from the merger of the National Society for Vocational Education and the Vocational Education Association of the Middle West. In 1998, reflecting a broader focus beyond job-specific training to include rigorous, skill-based career education, the organization was renamed the Association for Career and Technical Education.

Throughout its history, AVA/ACTE has played a significant role in shaping federal CTE policy:

The George-Deen Act of 1936 expanded federal funding for vocational education to include teacher education and training for marketing occupations.

The Carl D. Perkins Vocational and Technical Education Act of 1984 and its subsequent amendments in 1990 and 1998 introduced accountability, alignment between secondary and postsecondary education, academic integration, and business partnerships.

The School-to-Work Opportunities Act of 1994 linked work-based and school-based learning, further integrating CTE with industry needs.

The Strengthening Career and Technical Education for the 21st Century Act (Perkins V) in 2018 is the most recent major federal legislation, continuing to shape the CTE landscape.

== About ACTE ==
The ACTE's membership is composed of more than 27,000 career and technical educators, administrators, researchers, guidance counselors and others involved in planning and conducting career and technical education programs at the secondary, postsecondary levels. ACTE's leadership is a volunteer Board of Directors elected by the members of the Association in an annual election. Board officers include the president, president-elect and past president. The ACTE produces publications, including issue briefs on topics such as improving student literacy skills in the context of learning hands-on skills.

== Policy and advocacy ==
One of ACTE’s most critical roles is representing the career and technical education field through advocacy activities, including direct lobbying, media relations and public awareness. This work promotes the value of CTE and the policies that are needed to support CTE practitioners, advance the field and improve student learning.

== CareerTech VISION ==
ACTE hosts and participates in a wide range of events throughout the year. Chief among them is the Association's annual conference CareerTech VISION. CareerTech VISION is designed to be an integral component of an educators overall professional learning plan. The format of VISION has been created to meet individual professional growth needs and align with institutional strategic-improvement plans. Participants drill deeper and accomplish more by taking advantage of a wide range of international partnerships and powerful business and industry connections.

== National Policy Seminar ==
The National Policy Seminar which is held every spring hosts over 400 career and technical educators, administrators and partners that come together to show their support for CTE on Capitol Hill. Attendees learn about federal policy priorities and upcoming legislative activities, and to help policymakers make the connection that CTE is the answer to many of the key challenges facing our country, including dropout rates, postsecondary access and completion, the skills gap, unemployment and more.

== See also ==
- National Center for Construction Education and Research
