= National Center for Construction Education and Research =

US non-profit organization

- Formation: January 1, 1996; 30 years ago
- Legal status: 501(c)(3)
- Purpose: Professional craft certification
- Headquarters: Alachua, Florida, U.S.
- Region served: U.S.
- Chairman: Mark Guliano
- President & Chief Executive Officer: Boyd Worsham
- Main organ: Board of Trustees
- Website: www.nccer.org

The National Center for Construction Education and Research (NCCER) is an American not-for-profit 501(c)(3) education foundation for professional craft certification, formed in 1996.

== Scope ==
The mission of NCCER is to provide rigorous and relevant workforce development solutions that create opportunities for individual career advancement and support industry growth. NCCER is recognized across the United States for its breadth of trade curricula, which span over 40 trades, and its workforce development system, which includes accreditation, training, assessment, certification and career development solutions for the construction and maintenance industries. After becoming NCCER-accredited, organizations can provide programs that lead to industry-recognized credentials for their learners.

The assessment for certification has two parts: the journey-level knowledge assessment and the performance evaluation. Passing both the written assessment and the performance verification for a craft results in an NCCER Certification.

== History ==
In 1991, eleven prolific construction companies met to address skilled worker shortages and create standard curricula with industry-recognized credentials. In 1993, the organization released the Master Trainer Instructor Certification Program, the Instructor Certification Training Program, and accreditation guidelines. That same year, fifty-three organizations applied for accreditation and the first completed module was entered into a "Registry System." On January 1, 1996, the foundation became recognized as a 501(c)(3) non-profit.

== OSHA ==
OSHA formally recognized NCCER Crane Operator Certification Program on May 20, 2010. A ceremony was held in Washington, D.C., that included the North American Crane Bureau, the US Assistant Secretary of Labor for OSHA, the Acting Director for OSHA’s Directorate of Construction, the President/CEO, Associated Builders and Contractors, Inc., the President/CEO, Associated General Contractors of America, the Vice President, Government Relations, American National Standards Institute (ANSI), that accredited NCCER under ANSI/ISOIEC 17024, and the President of NCCER.

== NTSA participants ==
The National Training Service Agreement (NTSA) currently has more than 140 contractors and association contributors and contractors can be directly reimbursed for approved training and workforce development expenditures. Participants also support development and industry advancement of craft training provided by NCCER.

== See also ==
- Association for Career and Technical Education
