= Jockey (disambiguation) =

A jockey is a professional horse racer.

Jockey may also refer to:

== Art and entertainment ==
- Disc jockey (commonly abbreviated as DJ), a person who selects and plays recorded music
- Jocky Wilson, a darts player
- Jockeys (TV series), a documentary reality television series that premiered in 2009 on Animal Planet
- Jockey (2021 film), an American drama film
- Jockey (2026 film), an upcoming Indian Tamil-language sports action drama film
- Radio personality, a person who has an on-air position in radio broadcasting
- Robot jockey, a machine used to race camels
- VJ (media personality), a video jockey
- Broadcast jockey (or BJ), a term used to refer to Korean streamers
- Jockey, zombie-like creatures from the video game Left 4 Dead 2
- Chicken jockey, a TikTok trend related to A Minecraft Movie

== Other ==
- Jockey, Indiana, a community in the United States
- Jockey International, a clothing manufacturer
- Jockey wheel, a retractable 'third' wheel on a trailer
- Jockeying, a move in association football

== See also ==
- Jock (disambiguation)
- Jockey Club (disambiguation)
