= Automotive industry in Belarus =

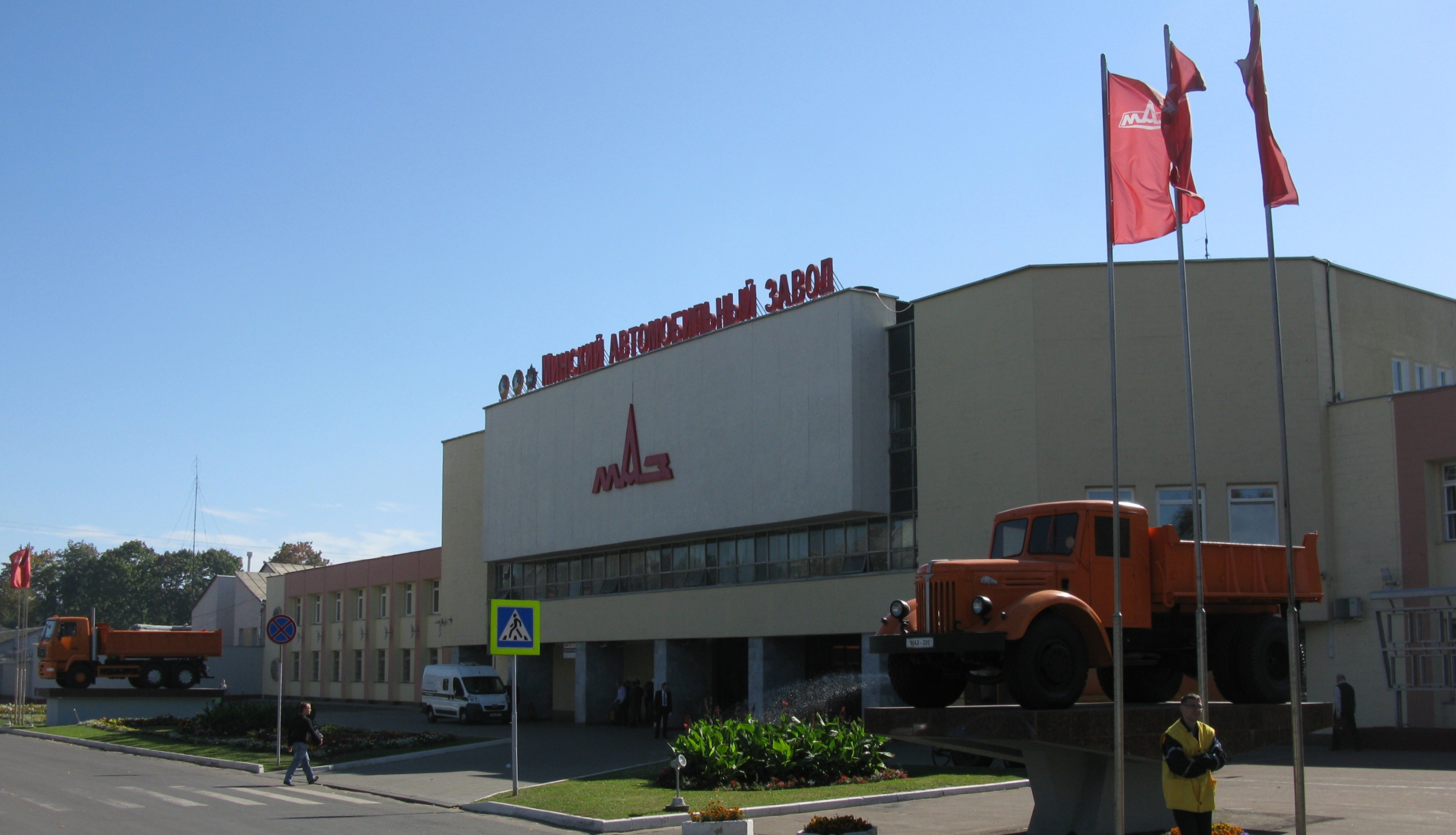
MAZ factory in Minsk

Belarus had third by volume part of automotive industry of the Soviet Union with near 40,000 annual production. Since that times Belarus specializes on production of own designed superheavy, heavy and middle trucks mainly plus post-Soviet developed buses, trolleybuses and trams. Auto manufacturers in Belarus include MAZ, BelAZ and Neman.

== Active manufacturers ==
=== BelAZ ===
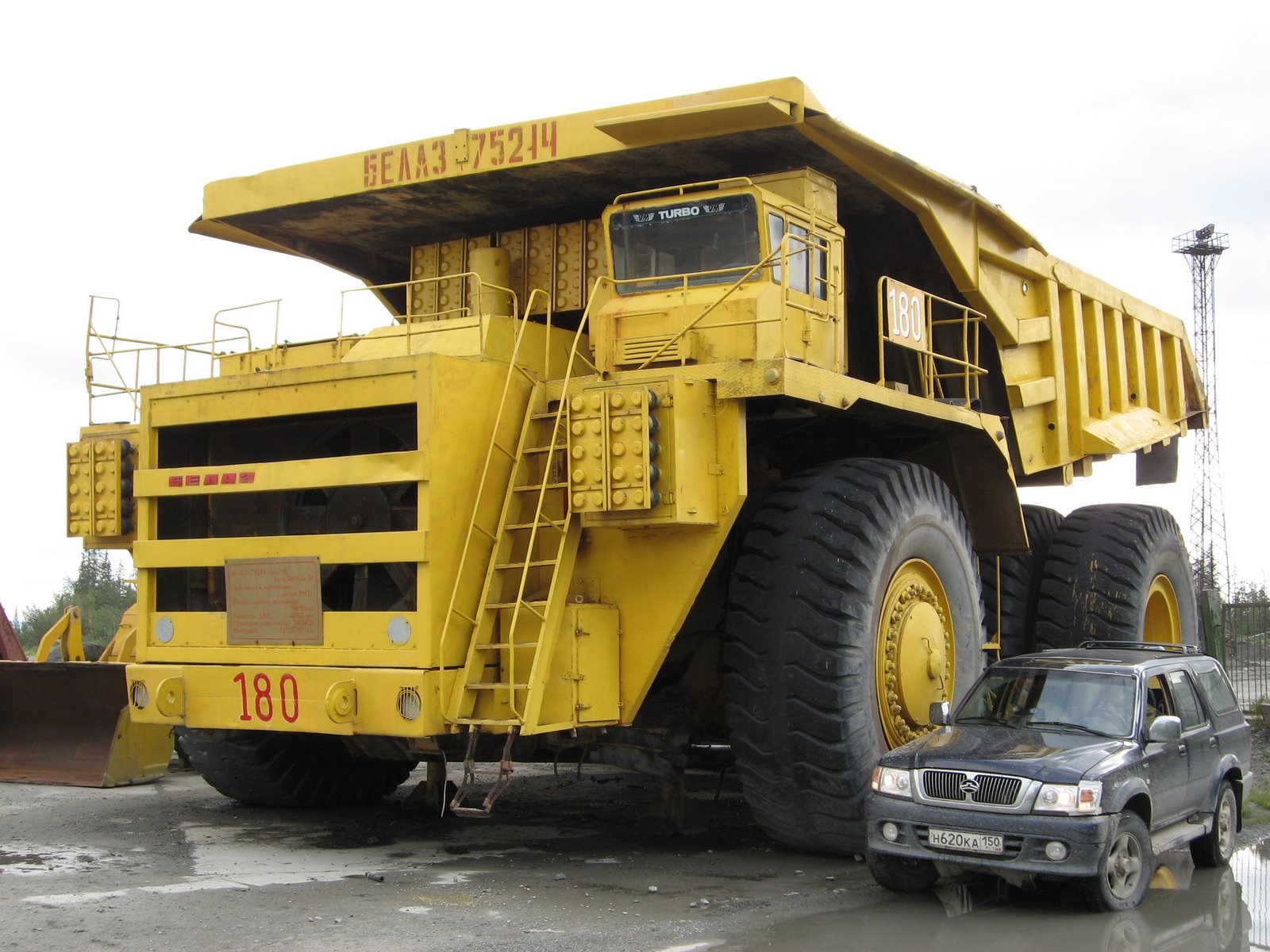
BelAZ-75214

BelAZ is a Belarusian manufacturer of haulage and earthmoving equipment based in Zhodzina. The factory opened its door in 1948 and has produced over 120,000 vehicles for use in the Soviet Union.

BELAZ is a site for one of the largest Commonwealth of Independent States investment project. The factory finalized two of the three scheduled phases of the technical re-equipment and upgrades. The Quality Management System applied in research and development, fabrication, erection and after-sale service of the equipment complies with international ISO 9000 standards.

- In 1948, a peat extraction machinery plant was constructed by the railroad station Žodzina.
- In 1951 the plant was expanded into the plant of road construction and land improvement machinery and renamed into "Dormash" (Дормаш), an abbreviation for "дорожное машиностроение", "road construction machinery building".
- In 1958 it was renamed into BelAZ. Initially it produced MAZ trucks.
- In 1961 the first 27-tonne BelAZ pit and quarry dump truck was manufactured.
- In 1990 a 280-tonne truck was manufactured.
- In 2001 the director of BelAZ plant, Pavel Maryev, was awarded the order Hero of Belarus.
- In 2003 plans were revealed for production of BelAZ-75600 with 320 tonne (352,600 kg, or 352.6 tons) capacity, ordered by Kuzbass mining.
- In 2006 the independent Mogilev Automobile Plant (MoAZ) was merged into BelAZ.
- In fall of 2006 the first delivery of BelAZ-75600.
- In April 2012, BelAZ announced it would hold an IPO – the first in Belarus.
- In September 2013, BelAZ presented the first sample of mining dump truck BelAZ-75710, the world largest dump truck with 450 tons load capacity.

=== MAZ ===
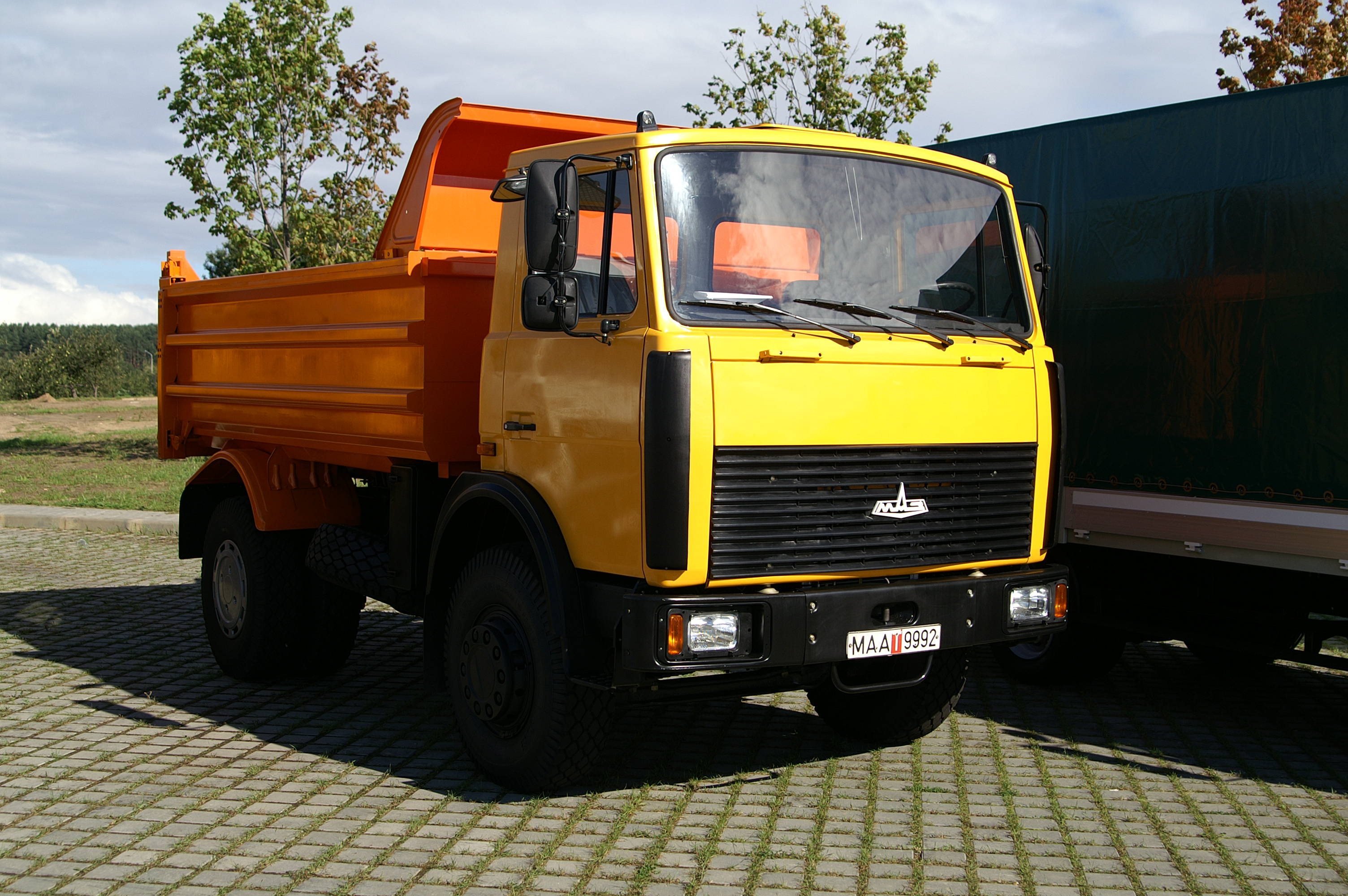
MAZ-5551

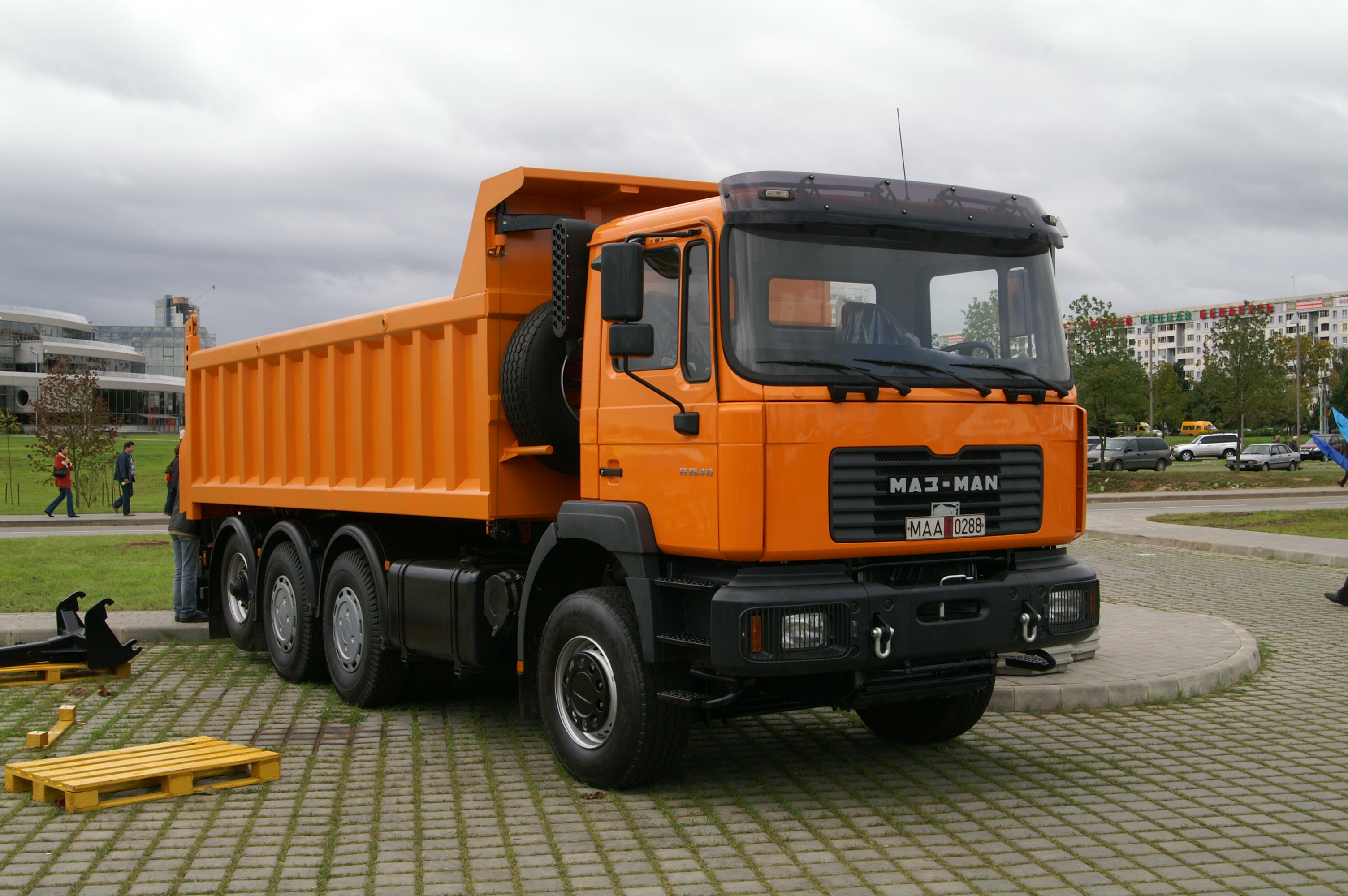
tipper, with the MAN F90 cab

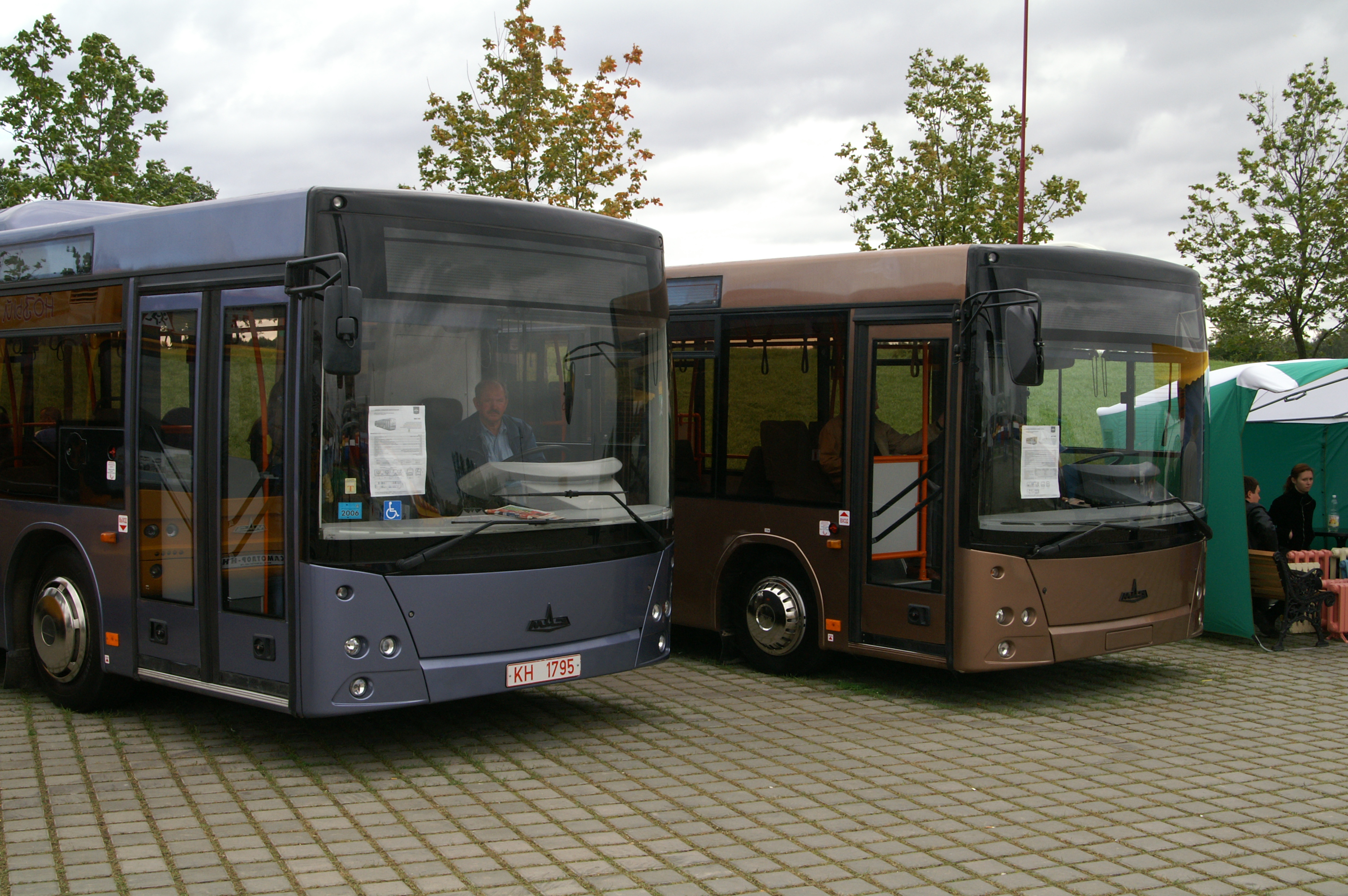
MAZ-203 and MAZ-206 buses

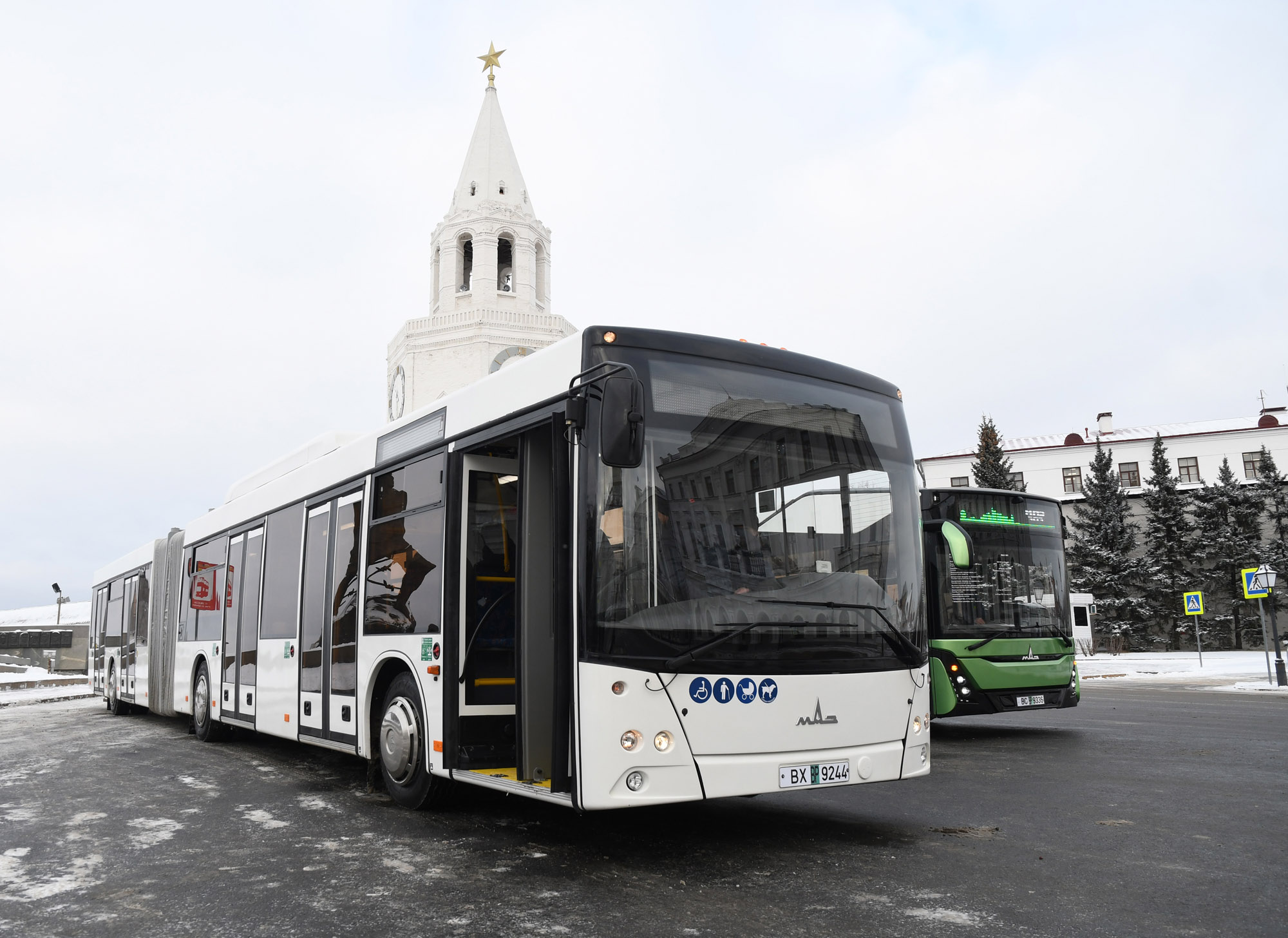
MAZ-215 and MAZ-303

Minsk Automobile Plant or MAZ is a state-run automotive manufacturer association in Belarus, one of the largest in Eastern Europe.

It was built shortly after the Second World War. The first MAZ model (MAZ-200) used General Motors designed 2-stroke engines. Later on their own original engines were developed and implemented in the MAZ-500 series. Not only the plant itself, but the entire living infrastructure were built in a short time. Apartment buildings, shops, medical clinics, cinemas etc. were built in close proximity to the MAZ plant, providing plant workers with local (though limited) necessities. On many of the construction sites German prisoners of war were working together with Belarusian construction workers. The majority of these buildings are still in service today.

It manufactures heavy-duty trucks, buses, trolleybuses, road tractors and semi-trailers for semi-trailer trucks, and cranes. MAZ was the world's largest manufacturer of TELs (Transporter-Erector-Launchers), during the Cold War era, peaking from the 1960s to late 1980s, for many of the world's mobile ballistic missiles, from the widely proliferated MAZ-543 used to carry and launch the Scud B through to the recent Topol M's impressive 8-axle TEL.

At the end of Soviet times, MAZ was the largest manufacturer of heavy trucks in the Soviet Union, and the only one for some truck categories. After the Soviet Union dissolved, MAZ production was reduced substantially, as has happened with many enterprises in the ultra-industrialized Belarus, oriented on the needs of a very big country. The previously mentioned production of public transport vehicles was a result of following diversification of the company.

Among other recent products, MAZ city buses (see pictures below) are operating throughout Belarus, as well as in Russia, Ukraine, Poland, Romania, Serbia and Estonia.

In Serbia, working in cooperation with a local-based company BIK (Bus industries Kragujevac), a production of gas-powered buses named BIK-203 has been agreed, which are based on the platform of MAZ-203 model. These buses have been delivered at several Serbian towns to be in use in public transportation companies.

In 1997, together with "MAN", a joint Belarusian-German company JSC "MAZ-MAN", Minsk was set up, which by 1998 had established full-scale production of heavy vehicles, using the F90 MAN cabs introduced 1986 and replaced 1994. Production of truck cabs involves huge, expensive tools, making this kind of recycling an existing design attractive. While production of tractors for international trade with 4x2 and 6x4 chassis layouts was a stated goal, development of exhaust gas regulations within the EU turned this into illusion. Based on the MAZ-MAN they have produced concrete mixers, fueling vehicles, flatbed trucks, dump trucks, front-end loaders etc.

Production of the Belarusian-German company demonstrated the advantage of technology created by combining the abilities and experience of auto makers of two countries. Compared to European models in the same class and quality range, MAZ-MAN products are on average 30% cheaper. Currently 98% of MAZ-MAN comply with Euro-3, while sale to the EU would require Euro-5 at least, Euro-6 by 2014.

In 2004, the joint venture made 272 vehicles, which is 45% higher than 2003. At the same time in 2003, output in comparison with 2002 increased by 50%.

28 November 2005 MAZ-MAN sold 1000 of the first MAZ-MAN tractor to customers.

=== MoAZ ===
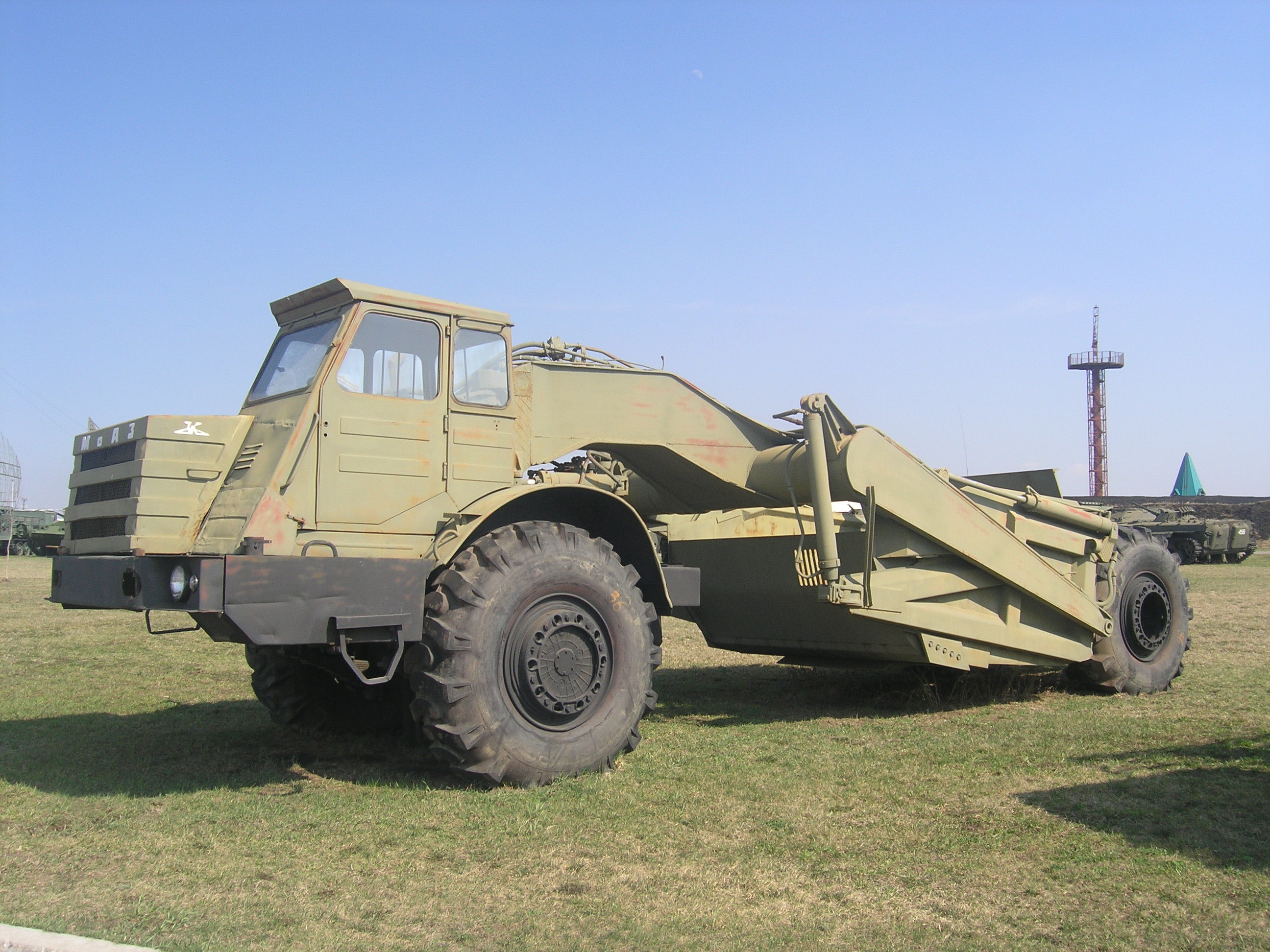
MOAZ-6014 Scraper in Togliatti Technical museum.

MoAZ or Mogilev Automobile Plant is an automotive and earth-moving equipment manufacturer in the city of Mogilev, Belarus. MoAZ is a subsidiary of BelAZ since 2006. In 1958 MoAZ was named in honor of Sergey Kirov, a prominent early Bolshevik leader in the Soviet Union.

The company was founded in 1935 as Workshop. In 1941 the plant was evacuated to Kuibyshev, where he mastered the production of engines for the attack aircraft IL-2.

After World War II the plant was returned to Mogilev and produced locomotives, steam-powered machinery, overhead cranes and oil trucks on chassis GAZ-51. In 1958 the factory conveyor technology named S. Kirov Mintyazhmasha USSR in Mogilev was transferred to the production of single-axle tractor MAZ-529, developed at the Minsk Automobile Plant. In 1960 MoAZ and Minsk Automobile Plant was transferred a group of designers, which became the basis of the technical services of the plant. Since that time MoAZ became one of the largest manufacturers of earth-moving equipment in the USSR.

In 2006 the factory became a branch of JSC "BelAZ". Since 2012 - the branch of "BelAZ" - managing company "BelAZ-Holding". The company mainly works on exports - more than 85% of production going to CIS member states.

=== MZKT ===
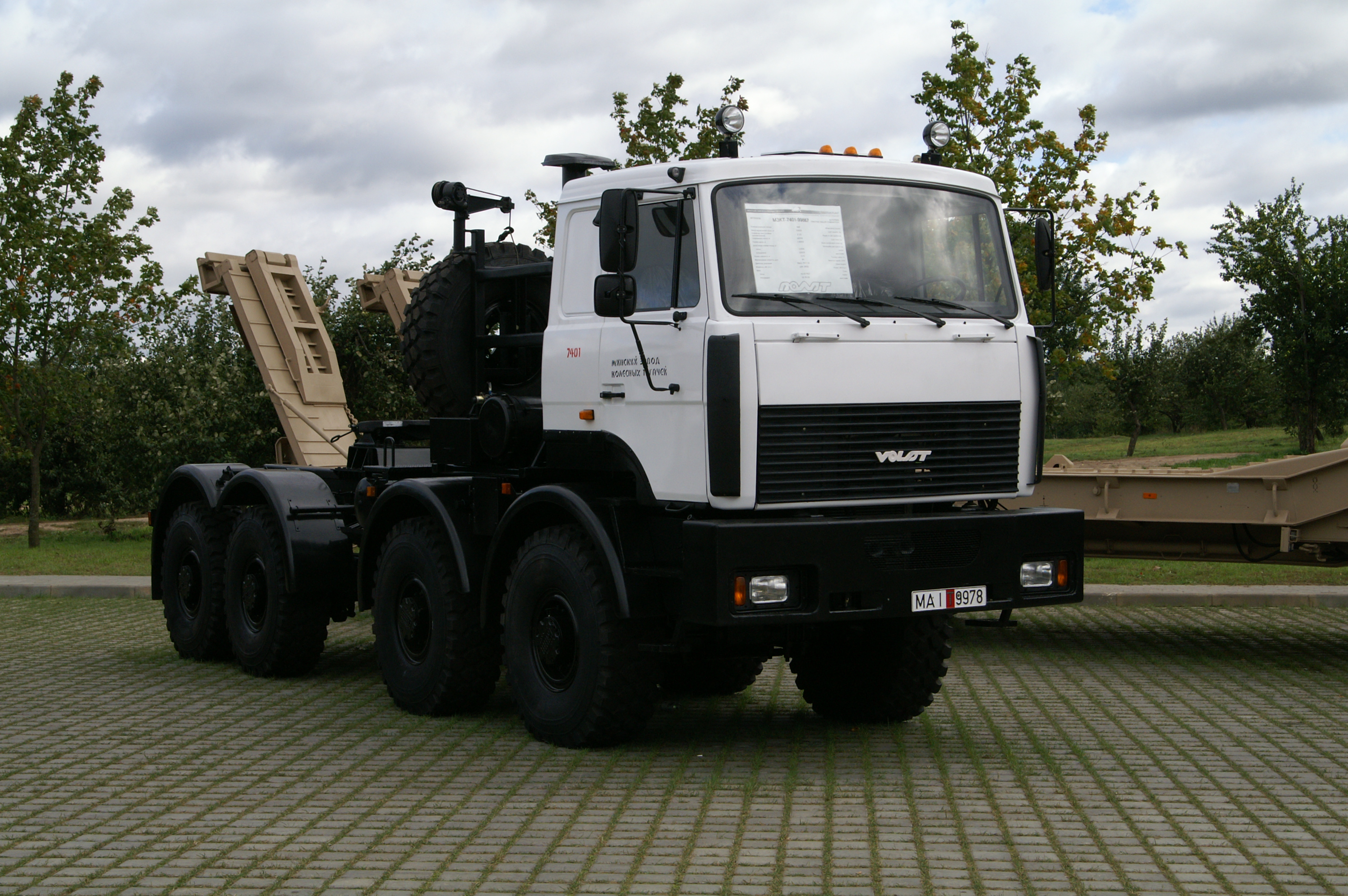
MZKT-7401

MZKT (Minsk Wheel Tractor Plant (MWTP)) is a manufacturer of heavy off-road vehicles, especially military trucks, based in Minsk, in Belarus; it was formerly a division of MAZ. MZKT civilian trucks are branded VOLAT. MZKT specializes in the production of road and off-road heavy-duty vehicles and trailers to them, as well as special wheeled chassis for installation of various equipment for enterprises and transport organizations of the construction, oil and gas and engineering complex.

In 1954, MZKT, the Minsk Wheeled Tractor Plant, was founded to develop artillery tractors; it then developed a series of heavy weapons transporters for the military of the USSR, including heavy offroad trucks such as the MAZ-537 and MAZ-7310. It was a division of Minsk Automobile Plant (known as MAZ). The name in Russian is "Минский завод колёсных тягачей"; this is abbreviated MZKT in English. In 1991, MZKT was spun off into a separate company; its former parent, MAZ, continues to make a broader range of heavy vehicles.

In 1992, military orders slowed, and MZKT attempted to adapt its products to civilian uses, such as mining trucks and crane carriers.

=== Neman ===
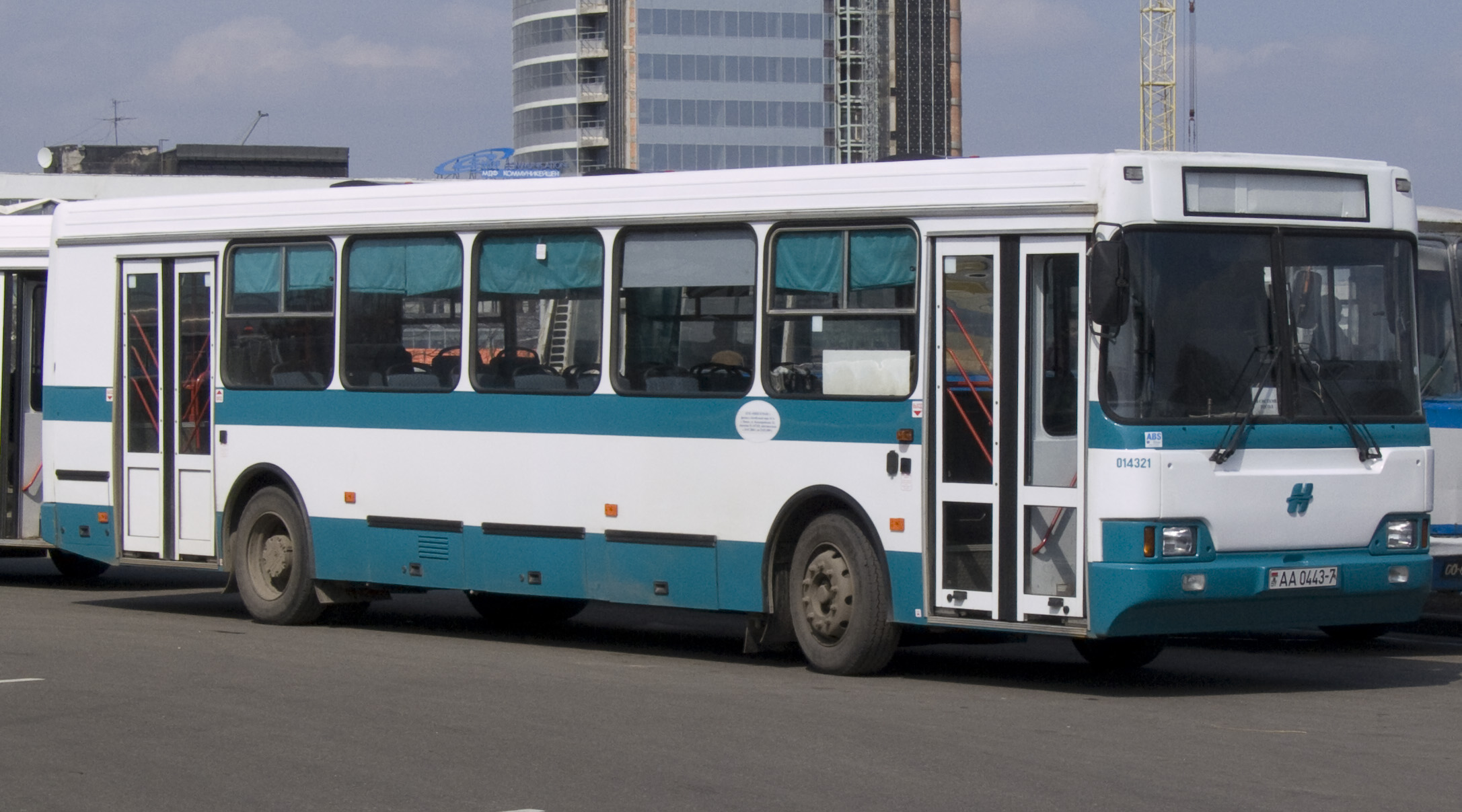
Neman-52012

Lida Buses Neman is a state-owned bus manufacturer located in Lida, Belarus.

The company was founded in May 1984 by the Ministry of Radio Industry of the Soviet Union to produce industrial equipment (assembly and testing machinery) for its parent Association Agat. In 1988, the plant was designated as pilot plant to manufacture prototypes. After the dissolution of the Soviet Union, the plant reoriented itself to produce household items (gas burners, electric motors, fans). Since the factory still had unused capacity, it entered into agreement with the Likino Bus Factory (LiAZ) to produce LiAZ-5256 buses. It produced its first bus in 1994. It also produced fire trucks AC-40, buses PAZ-3205, vans GAZelle. In 1998, the company began to produce its own original Neman buses. In June 2011, the company produced its 1000th bus.

== Former manufacturers ==
=== Ford Union ===
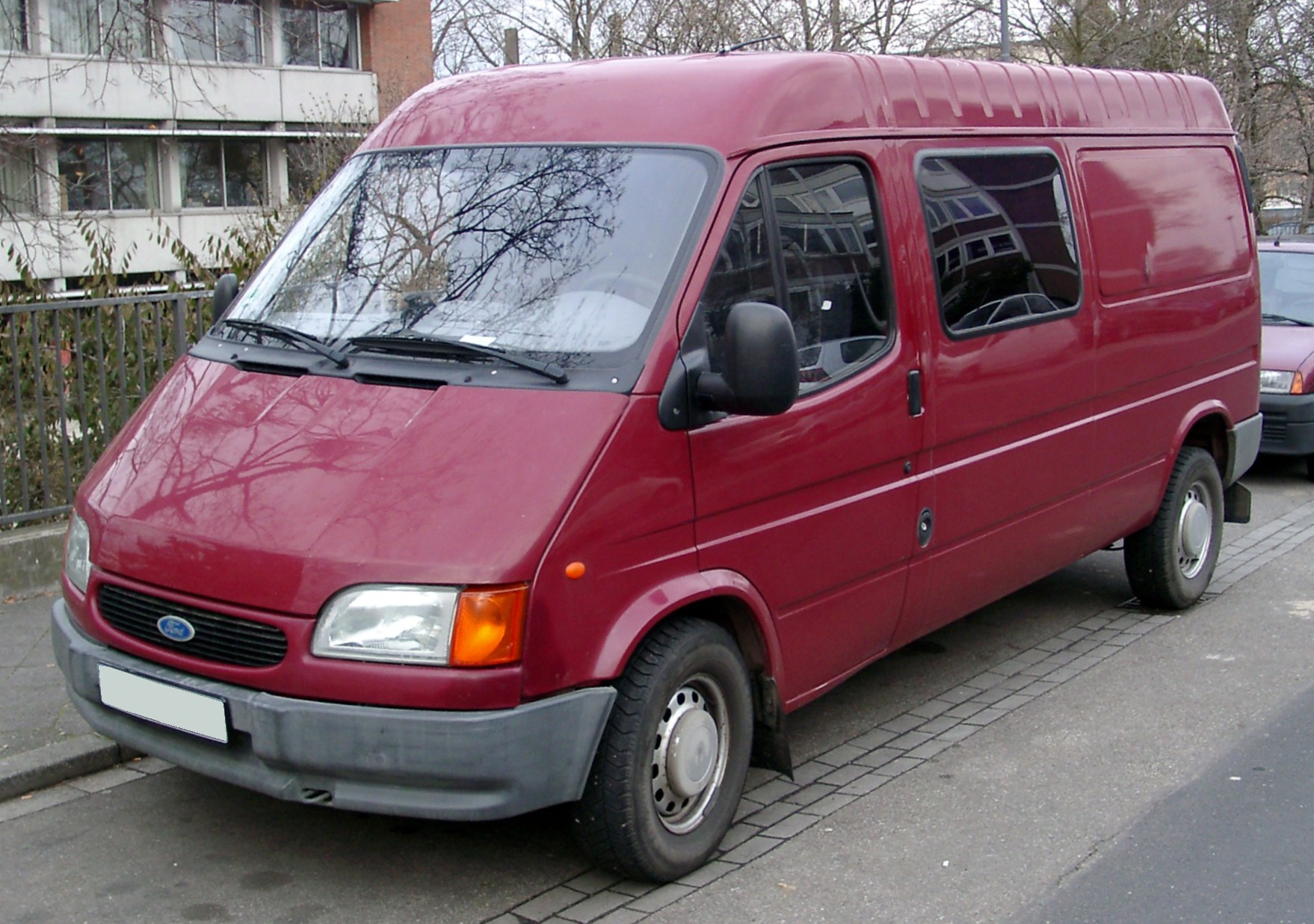
Ford Transit

The Ford Union is a former joint venture of the Ford Motor Company, the Russian Lada importer Lada-OMC and the Belarusian government. It was located in Abchak near the city of Minsk in Belarus. Ford has invested a capital of US$10.000.000 for building this plant. So it was the most expensive plant of the Ford concern in Western Europe at this time. The company existed from 1997 up to 2000 when it was closed due to low sales.

The Ford Union was not a manufacturer, it was only an assembler of SKD kits. The vehicles assembled by the Belarusian plant can be identified by the manufacturer code Y4F on the start on the VIN and an R on the eleventh position for the plant identification.

The plant become well-known on 23 July 1997 as president Alexander Grigoryevich Lukashenko was invited to a press conference with five strategically selected foreign journalists to discuss a predicted failure which later proved true.
