= Jockey Club (disambiguation) =

Jockey Club is a British horse-sports organisation.

Jockey Club also may refer to:

== Horse racing ==
=== Organisations ===
- jockey club, a generic term for organisations which promote or regulate horse racing
- Jockey Club (United States), a breed registry
- Jockey Club Brasileiro, owner of the Hipódromo da Gávea race track
- Jockey Club of Canada
- Jockey Club del Paraguay, owner of the Jockey Club (Asunción) race track
- Jockey Club del Perú
- Jockey Club of Turkey
- Australian Jockey Club, which merged into the Australian Turf Club
- Beijing Jockey Club (defunct)
- Hong Kong Jockey Club
  - Hong Kong Jockey Club Champion Awards
- Macau Jockey Club (defunct)
- Manila Jockey Club
- Miami Jockey Club, former operator of the Hialeah Park Race Track
- South Australian Jockey Club

=== Races ===
- Jockey Club Cup (Hong Kong)
- Jockey Club Gold Cup, United States
- Jockey Club Mile, Hong Kong
- Jockey Club Rose Bowl, England
- Jockey Club Sprint, Hong Kong
- Jockey Club Stakes, England
- American Jockey Club Cup, Japan
- Gran Premio Jockey Club (Uruguay)
- Gran Premio del Jockey Club, Italy
- Kentucky Jockey Club Stakes, United States
- Prix du Jockey Club, France

== Other sports ==
- Jockey Club Córdoba, an Argentine sports and social club
- Jockey Club de Rosario, an Argentine sports and social club
- Jockey Club Român, a Romanian sports club
- Copa de Competencia Jockey Club, a former football competition in Argentina
- Picadero JC, a former sports club in Spain

== Education ==
- Jockey Club Government Secondary School, Hong Kong
- Jockey Club Ti-I College, a secondary school in Hong Kong
- Hong Kong Jockey Club College, an employee training institution

== Other ==
- Jockey Club (Atlantic City, New Jersey), a former jazz club in the United States
- Jockey Club (Buenos Aires), a gentleman's club in Argentina
- Jockey Club Creative Arts Centre, an art colony in Hong Kong
- Jockey-Club de Paris, a gentleman's club in France
- Jockey Club Kau Sai Chau Public Golf Course, a golf course in Hong Kong
- Jockey Club, a condominium and timeshare building in Las Vegas
- Jockey Club, a fragrance released by Caswell-Massey
- The Jockey Club Live, a British music promotion company
