= Defender (association football) =

Association football position

Argentine defender, Gonzalo Montiel, in the 2026 FIFA World Cup final.

In the sport of association football (or soccer as it is known in the US), a defender is an outfield player whose primary role is to stop attacks during the game and prevent the opposition from scoring.

Defenders fall into four main categories: centre-backs, full-backs, sweepers, and wing-backs. The centre-back and full-back positions are most common in modern formations. The sweeper and wing-back roles are more specialised, often limited to certain formations dependent on the manager's style of play and tactics.

== Centre-back ==
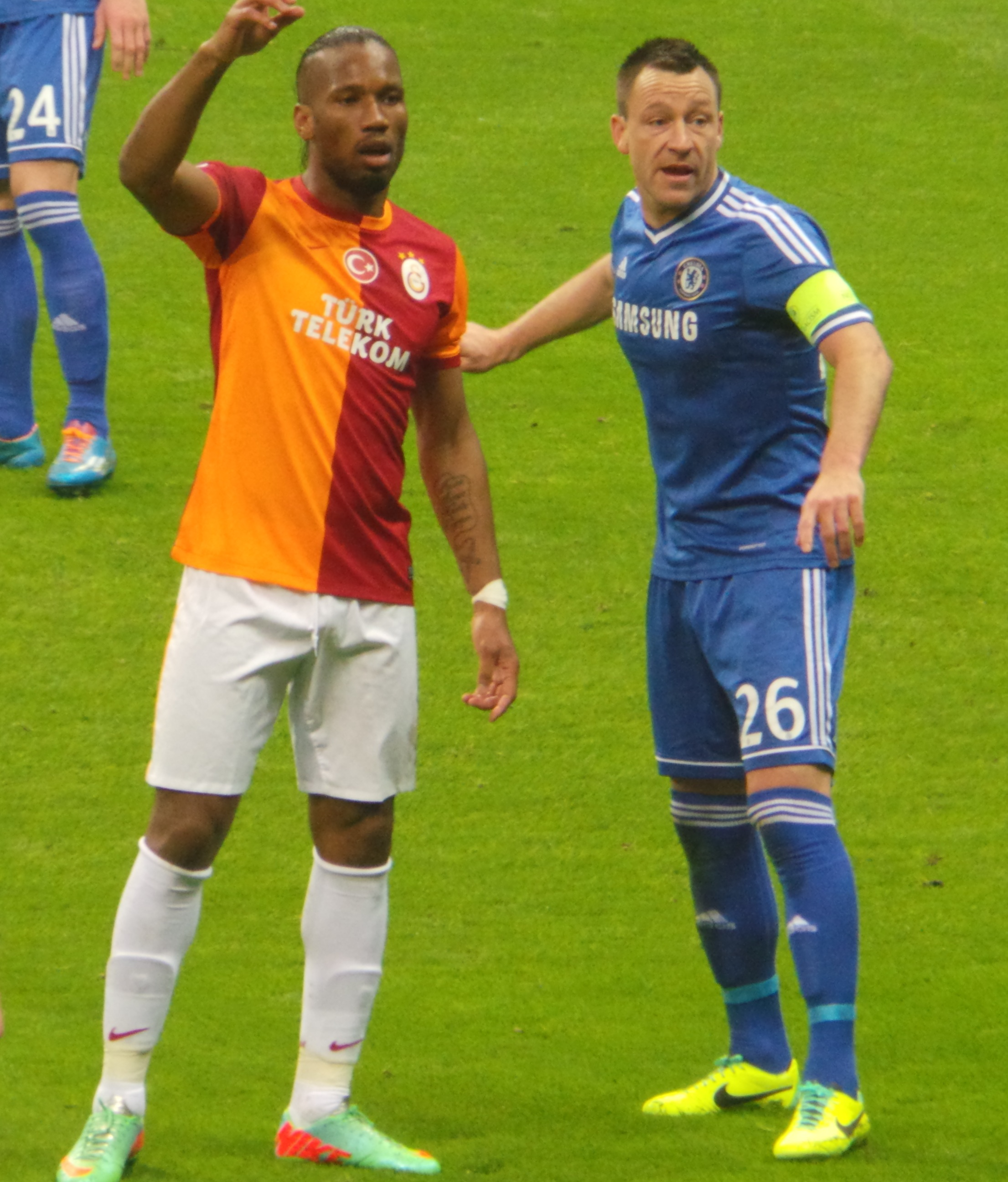
Centre-back John Terry (right) closely marks centre-forward Didier Drogba.

The centre-back (also known as a central defender or centre-half, as the modern role of the centre-back arose from the centre-half position) defends in the area directly in front of the goal and tries to prevent opposing players, particularly centre-forwards, from scoring. Centre-backs accomplish this by blocking shots, tackling, intercepting passes, contesting headers and marking forwards to discourage the opposing team from passing to them. Centre-backs are often tall and positioned for their ability to win duels in the air. In the modern game, most teams employ two or three centre-backs in front of the goalkeeper. The 4–2–3–1, 4–3–3, and 4–4–2 formations all use two centre-backs.

The common 4–4–2 formation uses two centre-backs.

In possession of the ball, centre-backs are generally expected to make long and pinpoint passes to their teammates, or to kick unaimed long balls down the field. For example, a clearance is a long unaimed kick intended to move the ball as far as possible from the defender's goal. Due to the many skills centre-backs are required to possess in the modern game, many successful contemporary central-defensive partnerships have involved pairing a more physical defender with a defender who is quicker, more comfortable in possession and capable of playing the ball out from the back; examples of such pairings include Carles Puyol and Gerard Pique for Barcelona and Spain or Diego Godín and José María Giménez with Atlético Madrid and Uruguay.

Under normal circumstances, centre-backs are unlikely to score goals. However, when their team takes a corner kick or other set pieces, centre-backs may move forward to the opponents' penalty area; if the ball is passed in the air towards a crowd of players near the goal, then the heading ability of a centre-back is useful when trying to score. In this case, other defenders or midfielders will temporarily move into the centre-back positions.

There are two main defensive strategies used by defensive lines: the zonal defence, where each centre-back covers a specific area of the pitch; and man-to-man marking, where each centre-back has the job of tracking a particular opposition player. In the now obsolete man–to–man marking systems such as catenaccio, as well as the zona mista strategy that later arose from it, there were often at least two types of centre-backs who played alongside one another: at least one man–to–man marking centre-back, known as the stopper, and a free defender, which was usually known as the sweeper, or libero, whose tasks included sweeping up balls for teammates and also initiating attacks.

== Sweeper (libero) ==
The 5–3–2 formation with a sweeper

The sweeper (or libero) is a more versatile centre-half who "sweeps up" the ball if an opponent manages to breach the defensive line. This position is deemed more fluid than that of the other defenders who man-mark their designated opponents. Because of this, it is sometimes referred to as libero, which is Italian for "free".

Austrian manager Karl Rappan is thought to be a pioneer of this role, when he incorporated it into his catenaccio or verrou (also "doorbolt/chain" in French) system with Swiss club Servette during the 1930s, deciding to move one player from midfield to a position behind the defensive line, as a "last man" who would protect the back-line and start attacks again. As coach of Switzerland in the 1930s and 1940s, Rappan played a defensive sweeper called the verrouilleur, positioned just ahead of the goalkeeper.

During his time with Soviet club Krylya Sovetov Kuybyshev in the 1940s, Aleksandr Abramov also used a position similar to a sweeper in his defensive tactic known as the Volzhskaya Zashchepka, or the "Volga clip". Unlike the verrou, his system was not as flexible and was a development of the WM rather than the 2–3–5, but it also featured one of the half-backs dropping deep; this allowed the defensive centre-half to sweep in behind the full-backs.

In Italy, the libero position was popularised by Nereo Rocco's and Helenio Herrera's use of catenaccio. The current Italian term for this position, libero, which is thought to have been coined by Gianni Brera, originated from the original Italian description for this role libero da impegni di marcatura (i.e., "free from man-marking tasks"); it was also known as the "battitore libero" ("free hitter", in Italian, i.e. a player who was given the freedom to intervene after their teammates, if a player had got past the defence, to clear the ball away). In Italian football, the libero was usually assigned the number six shirt.

One of the first predecessors of the libero role in Italy was used in the so–called "vianema" system, a predecessor to catenaccio, which was used by Salernitana during the 1940s. The system originated from an idea that one of the club's players – Antonio Valese – posed to his manager Giuseppe Viani. Viani altered the English WM system – known as the sistema in Italy – by having his centre-half-back retreat into the defensive line to act as an additional defender and mark an opposing centre-forward, instead leaving his full-back (which, at the time, was similar to the modern centre-back role) free to function as what was essentially a sweeper, creating a 1–3–3–3 formation; he occasionally also used a defender in the centre-forward role, and wearing the number nine shirt, to track back and mark the opposing forwards, thus freeing up the full-backs from their marking duties. Andrea Schianchi of La Gazzetta dello Sport notes that this modification was designed to help smaller teams in Italy, as the man–to–man system often put players directly against one another, favouring the larger and wealthier teams with stronger individual players.

In Italy, the libero is also thought to have evolved from the centre-half-back role in the English WM system, or sistema, which was known as the centromediano metodista role in Italian football jargon, due to its association with the metodo system; in the metodo system, however, the "metodista" was given both defensive and creative duties, functioning as both a ball–winner and deep-lying playmaker. Juventus manager Felice Borel used Carlo Parola in the centre-half role, as a player who would drop back into the defence to mark opposing forwards, but also start attacks after winning back possession, in a similar manner to the sweeper, which led to the development of this specialised position. Indeed, Herrera's catenaccio strategy with his Grande Inter side saw him withdraw a player from his team's midfield and instead deploy them further-back in defence as a sweeper.

Prior to Viani, Ottavio Barbieri is also thought by some pundits to have introduced the sweeper role to Italian football during his time as Genoa's manager. Like Viani, he was influenced by Rappan's verrou, and made several alterations to the English WM system or "sistema", which led to his system being described as mezzosistema. His system used a man-marking back-line, with three man-marking defenders and a full-back who was described as a terzino volante (or vagante, as noted at the time by former footballer and Gazzetta dello Sport journalist Renzo De Vecchi); the latter position was essentially a libero, which was later also used by Viani in his vianema system, and Rocco in his catenaccio system.

Though sweepers may be expected to build counter-attacking moves, and as such require better ball control and passing ability than typical centre-backs, their talents are often confined to the defensive realm. For example, the catenaccio system of play, used in Italian football in the 1960s, often employed a predominantly defensive sweeper who mainly "roamed" around the back line; according to Schianchi, Ivano Blason is considered to be the first true libero in Italy, who – under manager Alfredo Foni with Inter and subsequently Nereo Rocco with Padova – would serve as the last man in his team, positioned deep behind the defensive line, and clearing balls away from the penalty area. Armando Picchi was subsequently also a leading exponent of the more traditional variant of this role in Helenio Herrera's Grande Inter side of the 1960s.

The more modern libero possesses the defensive qualities of the typical libero while being able to expose the opposition during counterattacks by carrying or playing the ball out from the back. Some sweepers move forward into midfield, and distribute the ball up-field, while others intercept passes and get the ball off the opposition without needing to hurl themselves into tackles. If the sweeper does move up the field to distribute the ball, they will need to make a speedy recovery and run back into their position. In modern football, its usage has been fairly restricted, with few clubs in the biggest leagues using the position.

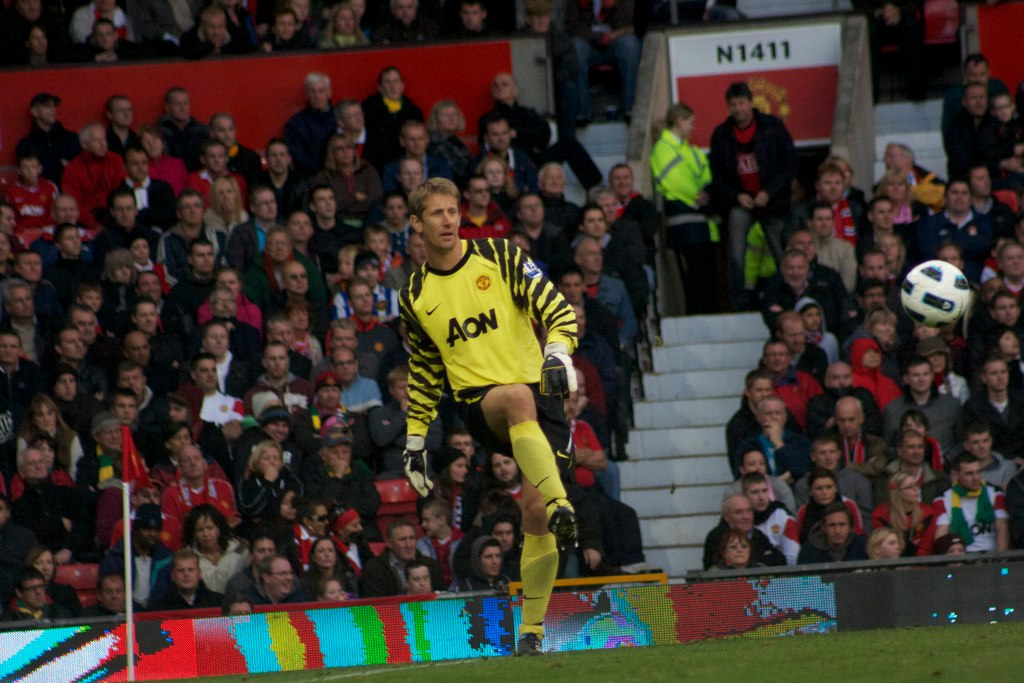
Edwin van der Sar, pictured playing for Manchester United during the 2010–11 season, is considered to be one of the pioneers of the sweeper-keeper role.

The modern example of this position is most commonly believed to have been pioneered by Franz Beckenbauer, and subsequently Gaetano Scirea, Morten Olsen and Elías Figueroa, although they were not the first players to play this position. Aside from the aforementioned Blason and Picchi, earlier proponents also included Alexandru Apolzan, Velibor Vasović, and Ján Popluhár. Giorgio Mastropasqua was known for revolutionising the role of the libero in Italy during the 1970s; under his Ternana manager Corrado Viciani, he served as one of the first modern exponents of the position in the country, due to his unique technical characteristics, namely a player who was not only tasked with defending and protecting the back-line, but also advancing out of the defence into midfield and starting attacking plays with their passing after winning back the ball. Other defenders who have been described as sweepers include Bobby Moore, Daniel Passarella, Franco Baresi, Ronald Koeman, Fernando Hierro, Matthias Sammer, and Aldair, due to their ball skills, vision, and long passing ability. Though it is rarely used in modern football, it remains a highly respected and demanding position.

Recent and successful uses of the sweeper include by Otto Rehhagel, Greece's manager, during UEFA Euro 2004. Rehhagel utilised Traianos Dellas as Greece's sweeper to great success, as Greece became European champions. For Bayer Leverkusen, Bayern Munich and Inter Milan, Brazilian international Lúcio adopted the sweeper role too, but was also not afraid to travel long distances with the ball, often ending up in the opposition's final third.

Although this position has become largely obsolete in modern football formations, due to the use of zonal marking and the offside trap, certain players such as Daniele De Rossi, Leonardo Bonucci, Javi Martínez, David Luiz and John Stones have played a similar role as a ball-playing central defender in a 3–5–2 or 3–4–3 formation; in addition to their defensive skills, their technique and ball-playing ability allowed them to advance into midfield after winning back possession, and function as a secondary playmaker for their teams.

Some goalkeepers, who are comfortable leaving their goalmouth to intercept and clear through balls, and who generally participate more in play, such as Jorge Campos, René Higuita, Manuel Neuer, Edwin van der Sar, Fabien Barthez, Hugo Lloris, Marc-André ter Stegen, Alisson Becker and Ederson, among others, have been referred to as sweeper-keepers.

== Full-back ==
WM formation of the 1920s showing three fullbacks, all in fairly central positions

The full-backs (the left-back and the right-back) locate the holding wide positions and up until the 1950s, the full-backs would traditionally stay in defence at all times, except on set-pieces. There is one full-back on each side of the field except in defences with fewer than four players, where there may be no full-backs and instead only centre-backs.

In the early decades of football under the 2–3–5 formation, the two full-backs had essentially the same role as modern centre-backs in that they were the last line of defence and usually covered opposing forwards in the middle of the field.

The later 3–2–5 style (also known as the WM formation) involved a third dedicated defender, causing the left and right full-backs to occupy wider positions. Later, the adoption of 4–2–4 with another central defender led the wide defenders to play even further over to counteract the opposing wingers, and also provide support offensively to complement their own wingers on the flanks. Brazil of the 1950s is often regarded as pioneering this style of play, with Djalma Santos and Nílton Santos viewed by many as the first modern wing-backs. Over time, the full-back position became increasingly specialised for dynamic players who could not only defend, but also had pace and crossing ability to fulfil this role, as opposed to the central defenders who remained fairly static and commonly relied on strength, height and positioning.

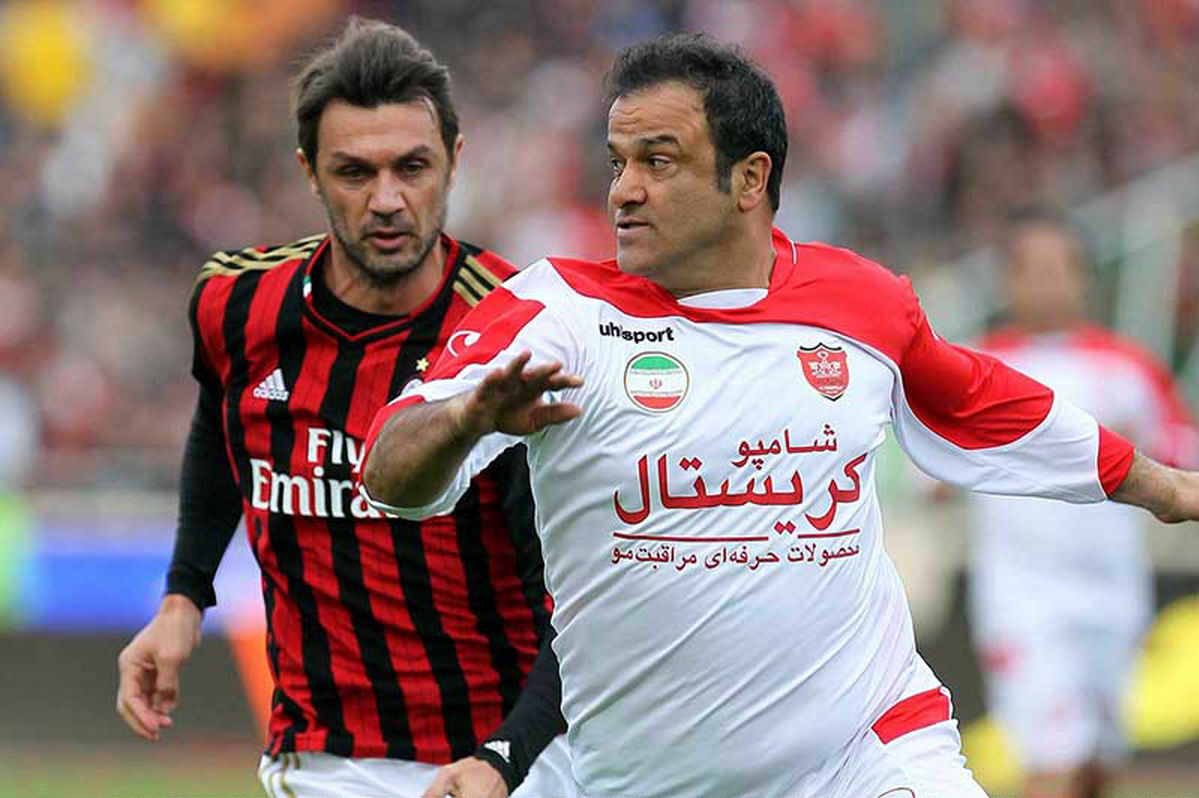
Paolo Maldini marking a player during a friendly match

In the modern game, full-backs have taken on a more attacking role than was the case traditionally, often overlapping with wingers down the flank, or more recently, playing "inverted", cutting into the middle of the pitch with the ball and shooting or passing to the strikers. Wingerless formations, such as the diamond 4–4–2 formation, demand the full-back to cover considerable ground up and down the flank. Some of the responsibilities of modern full-backs include:

- Provide a physical obstruction to opposition attacking players by shepherding them towards an area where they exert less influence. They may manoeuvre in a fashion that causes the opponent to cut in towards the centre-back or defensive midfielder with their weaker foot, where they are likely to be dispossessed. Otherwise, jockeying and smart positioning may simply pin back a winger in an area where they are less likely to exert influence.
- Making off-the-ball runs into spaces down the channels and supplying crosses into the opposing penalty box.
- Throw-ins are often assigned to full-backs.
- Marking wingers and other attacking players. Full-backs generally do not commit to challenges in their opponents' half. However, they aim to quickly dispossess attacking players who have already breached the defensive line with a sliding tackle from the side. Markers must, however, avoid keeping too tight on opponents or risk disrupting the defensive organisation.
- Maintaining tactical discipline by ensuring other teammates do not overrun the defensive line and inadvertently play an opponent onside.
- Providing a passing option down the flank; for instance, by creating opportunities for sequences like one-two passing moves.
- In wingerless formations, full-backs need to cover the roles of both wingers and full-backs, although defensive work may be shared with one of the central midfielders.
- Additionally, attacking full-backs help to pin both opposition full-backs and wingers deeper in their own half with aggressive attacking intent. Their presence in attack also forces the opposition to withdraw players from central midfield, which the team can seize to its advantage.

Due to the physical and technical demands of their playing position, successful full-backs need a wide range of attributes, which make them suited for adaptation to other roles on the pitch. Many of the game's utility players, who can play in multiple positions on the pitch, are natural full-backs. Two rather prominent examples are former A.C. Milan left-back Paolo Maldini and the former PSG full-back Sergio Ramos, who have played on the flanks as full-backs and in central defence throughout their career. In the modern game, full-backs often chip in a fair share of assists with their runs down the flank when the team is on a counter-attack like Leighton Baines and Trent Alexander-Arnold. The more common attributes of full-backs, however, include:

- Pace and stamina to handle the demands of covering large distances up and down the flank and outrunning opponents.
- A healthy work rate and team responsibility.
- Marking and tackling abilities and a sense of anticipation.
- Good off-the-ball ability to create attacking opportunities for their team by running into empty channels.
- Dribbling ability. Many of the game's eminent attacking full-backs are excellent dribblers in their own right and occasionally deputise as attacking wingers.
- Player intelligence. As is common for defenders, full-backs need to decide during the flow of play whether to stick close to a winger or maintain a suitable distance. Full-backs that stay too close to attacking players are vulnerable to being pulled out of position and leaving a gap in the defence. A quick passing movement like a pair of one-two passes will leave the channel behind the defending full-back open. This vulnerability is a reason why wingers considered to be dangerous are double-marked by both the full-back and the winger. This allows the full-back to focus on holding their defensive line.

Full-backs rarely score goals, as they often have to stay back to cover for the centre-backs during corner kicks and free kicks, when the centre backs usually go forward to attempt to score from headers. That said, full-backs can sometimes score during counterattacks by running in from the wings, often involving one-two passing moves with midfield players.

=== Inverted full-backs ===
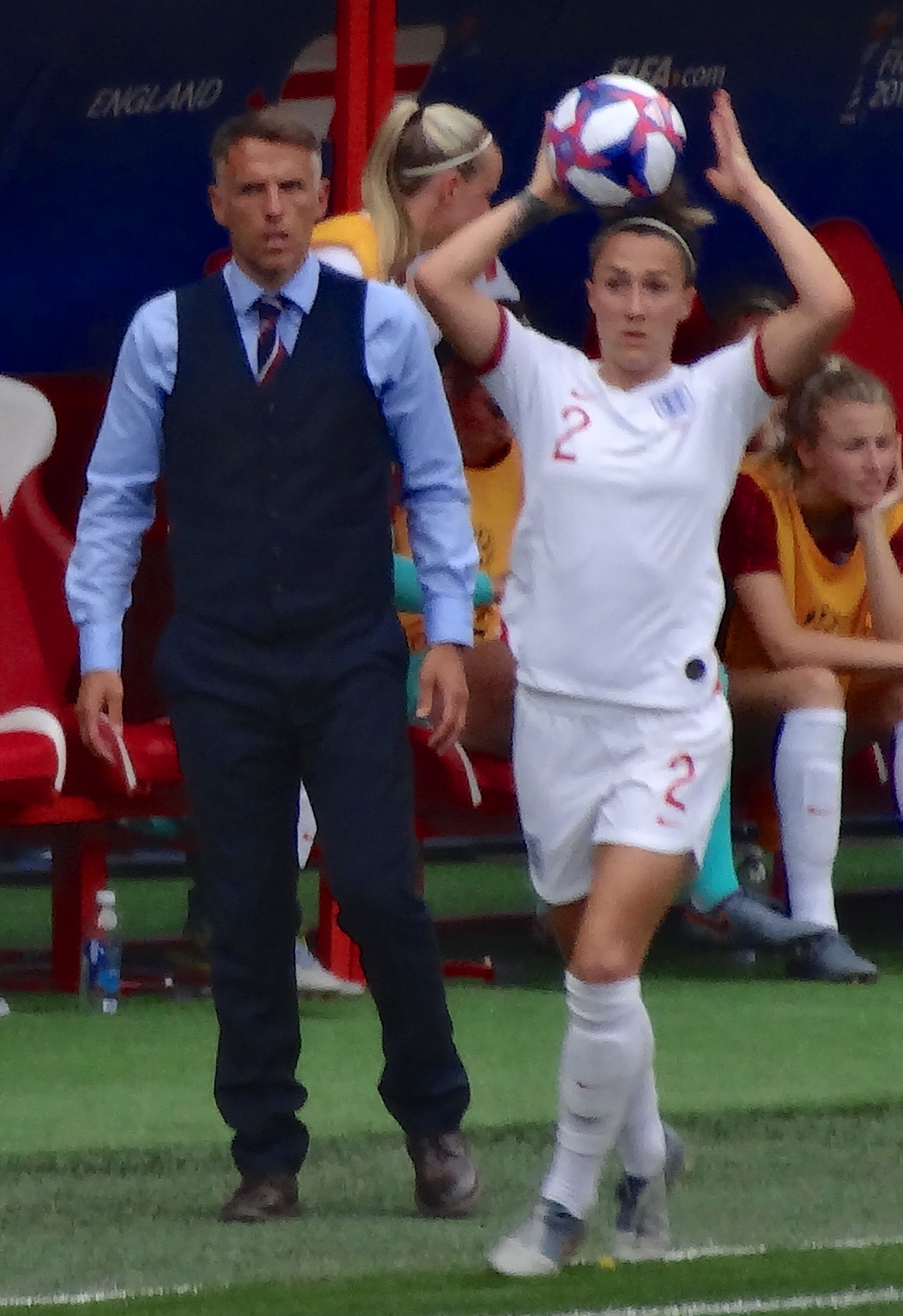
Lucy Bronze (right) pictured taking a throw-in during the 2019 FIFA Women's World Cup, with then-England coach Phil Neville, has been used as an inverted full-back on occasion throughout her career.

An inverted full-back is a defender who, instead of remaining in a wide position, moves into central midfield areas when their team has possession. This tactical movement creates an extra body in midfield to overload the central zones. The origin of the tactic is often traced to Johan Cruyff’s Barcelona team, who “pioneered the use of full-backs in central roles”, but it was Pep Guardiola who popularized it at Bayern Munich and Manchester City. Under Guardiola, players like Philipp Lahm and David Alaba were regularly asked to tuck inside in buildup play. João Cancelo, particularly during his time at Manchester City, Nico O'Reilly, and Trent Alexander-Arnold at Liverpool have exemplified the inverted full-back role by moving into central areas to utilise their passing range during attacking phases. Lucy Bronze has also been used in the inverted full-back role with Lyon.

In possession, an inverted full-back functions almost like an additional midfielder. They often form passing triangles with the centre-backs and midfielders, providing forward passing angles and helping the team progress the ball through the middle. This requires excellent technical ability and vision to operate in congested central areas. By tucking inside, an inverted full-back allows midfielders (such as number eights) to push higher, effectively turning a 4–3–3 into a 3–2–2–3 shape in possession. Teams that dominate possession use this movement to create a numerical advantage in midfield, which can pull the opposition's wide defenders out of position and open space elsewhere on the flank.

When the ball is lost, the inverted full-back typically drops back to a wider defensive position. In the immediate moments after a turnover, however, they help disrupt the opposition's attack from the centre. Coaches note that they will “briefly remain in the centre of the pitch,” breaking up or slowing counterattacks through interceptions or tackles. This central presence also aids the team's counter-pressing, as the inverted full-back can screen passes toward the strikers and help limit space in the midfield. Eventually, though, they recover to cover the flank, ensuring the team is not exposed on that side.

Many modern coaches have used inverted full-backs. Guardiola's Bayern and City sides are the most famous examples, but managers like Marcelo Bielsa (Chile), Roberto De Zerbi, and Ange Postecoglou have also employed versions of this tactic. Mikel Arteta’s Arsenal have regularly seen Ben White or Oleksandr Zinchenko sit narrowly inside during possession.

This role carries certain risks: without a traditional overlapping full-back, teams may lack width in attack and risk isolating their wingers. It also requires extremely versatile players – as noted, teams “need to be top-class to do it”, since few defenders are both technical playmakers and quick recoverers. When executed well, however, inverted full-backs can help a team dominate possession, create overloads in midfield, and draw opponents out of position, adding a tactical edge to the side's build-up play.

== Wing-back ==
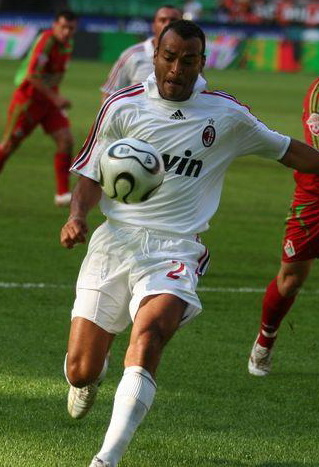
Cafu, pictured playing for AC Milan, was capable of playing either as a full-back or as a wing-back.

The wing-back is a variation on the full-back, but with a heavier emphasis on attack. Wing-backs are typically some of the fastest players on a team, when employed. Wing-backs are typically used in a formation with three centre-backs and are sometimes classified as midfielders instead of defenders. They can, however, be used in formations with only two centre-backs, such as in Jürgen Klopp's 4–3–3 system that he used at Liverpool, in which the wing-backs play high up the field to compensate for a lack of width in attack. In the evolution of the modern game, wing-backs are the combination of wingers and full-backs. As such, this position is one of the most physically demanding in modern football. Successful use of wing-backs is one of the main prerequisites for the 3–5–2 and 5–3–2 formations to function effectively.

Wing-backs are often more adventurous than full-backs and are expected to provide width, especially in teams without wingers. A wing-back needs to be of exceptional stamina, be able to provide crosses upfield and defend effectively against opponents' attacks down the flanks. A defensive midfielder may be fielded to cover the advances of wing-backs. It can also be occupied by wingers and side midfielders in a three centre-back formation, as seen by Italian manager Antonio Conte.

Examples of players who could and did play as wing-backs were AC Milan teammates Cafu and Serginho, former Barcelona player Dani Alves, former Arsenal player Hector Bellerin, Roberto Carlos of Real Madrid's Galácticos era, former River Plate's defender Juan Pablo Sorín, World Cup winning German Andreas Brehme, Parma's legend Antonio Benarrivo, Angelo Di Livio of Juventus and Italy and former Corinthians, Arsenal and Barcelona star Sylvinho.

== See also ==
- Association football positions
- Association football tactics
- Forward
- Goalkeeper
- Midfielder
