= MAZ-529 =

One-axle-tractor, produced in the 50s in MAZ- plant, later on in MoAZ plant

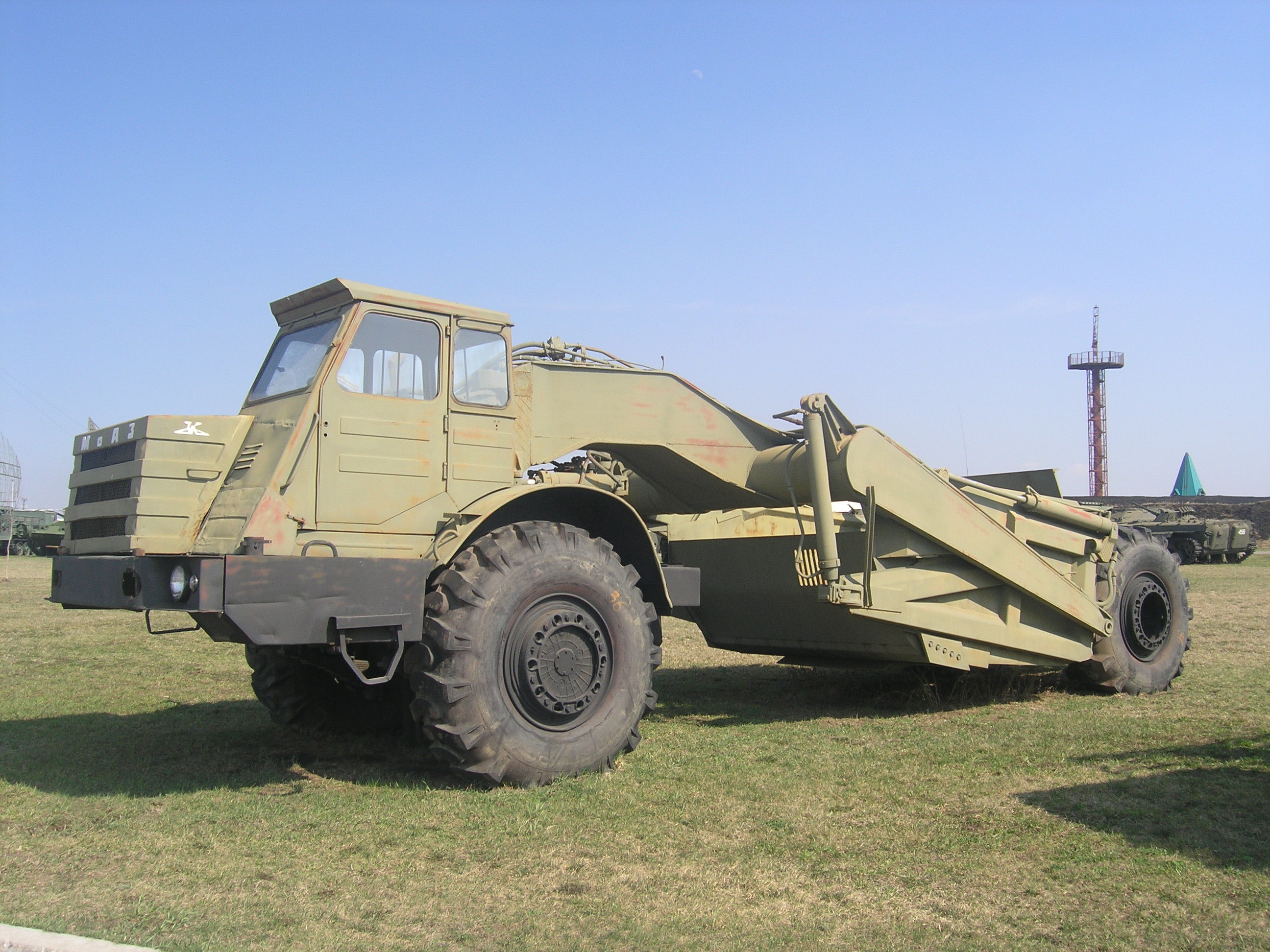

Overview
- Manufacturer: MAZ (1955-1958); MoAZ (1959-1969)
- Also called: MoAZ-529 (1961-1973)
- Production: 1959-1973

Body and chassis
- Body style: tractor

Powertrain
- Engine: 7.0L YaMZ-206 I6 diesel

The MAZ-529 (МАЗ-529) is a uniaxial tractor designed by the Soviet vehicle manufacturer Minsky Automobilny Zavod (MAZ), which started production in 1959. From 1958, production of this type was relocated to MoAZ as part of the specialization of the Soviet automobile industry and continued there until 1973 under the name MoAZ-529.

== Background ==
Prior to 1955 American models of heavy uniaxial tractors had been introduced to the Soviet Union. For example, from 1955 on there were tests with these very vehicles in order to examine them for their possible applications. In 1956 the first indigenous prototype of such a tractor was built at MAZ. This too was extensively tested, with the goal of universal applicability. Trailers were built and tested in the form of scrapers, cement mixers, simple flatbeds and even an artificial ice rink.

After completing the tests, MAZ quickly started series production of the machines. Even in 1956, the Soviet automobile industry was already so specialized that the complete train was no longer manufactured by MAZ. Only the tractor was made in Minsk, the trailer (in the standard production version a scraper) was already built at MoAZ. Since the tractor is not able to drive on its own without a trailer, a much smaller support wheel was mounted at the front to prevent the vehicle tipping over. Before normal operation, this jockey wheel was removed.

These vehicles should not be confused with single axle tractors, even if they also have only one axis and are used as a tractor for attachments. A special feature of the vehicle is that no suspension was installed. Only the big tires are used for damping.

In 1965 the improved MAZ-529E was built at MoAZ. It had an increased output of 151 kW (202 hp) and was also manufactured until 1969, before being replaced by the MoAZ-546P. Production of the MoAZ-529 continued until 1973.

== Technical data ==
The information refers to the basic version of the MAZ-529.

- Engine: six-cylinder two-stroke diesel engine
- Engine type: JaAZ -206 (according to other data also a version with JaAZ-204 four-cylinder diesel engine)
- Power: 121 kW (165 hp) (or 120 hp with JaAZ-204 engine)
- Transmission: manual five-speed gearbox
- Top speed: 40 km / h
- Tire dimension: 21.00-28 (1790 mm diameter)
- Trailer as a scraper: D-357
- Total permissible weight of the train: 34 tons
- Drive formula (tractor): (2 × 2)
