= The Jockey Club Live =

British music promoter company

- Industry: Entertainment; Entertainment Promoter
- Founded: 2013
- Headquarters: London
- Area served: United Kingdom
- Website: http://www.thejockeyclublive.co.uk

The Jockey Club Live is a live music promoter company, who work alongside The Jockey Club (the largest racecourse group in the UK) to produce large scale outdoor concerts at major racecourses.

The Jockey Club Live was founded by Andrew Wilkinson and Simon Halden, who previously worked on tours for acts such as The Rolling Stones, Pink Floyd, Robbie Williams and Kylie Minogue.

Since The Jockey Club Live launched in 2014 it has promoted over 170 concerts with a combined attendance of over 1.5 million, and was revealed by Music Week as the UK’s 6th largest music promoter.

== 2014 ==
In 2014 Music Week revealed that The Jockey Club Live was the sixth largest live music promoter in the UK based on attendances, having staged live music after racing for nearly 300,000 people in its first year of operation.

Between 31 May and 6 September 2014, the company staged 29 events across 9 racecourses, including performances from:

- Sir Tom Jones
- Jessie J
- Kaiser Chiefs
- Beach Boys
- Dizzee Rascal
- James Blunt
- Boyzone
- Wet Wet Wet

== 2015 ==
In February 2015 The Jockey Club Live announced that Kylie Minogue would be performing at Newmarket Racecourse and Haydock Park Racecourse.

Tickets for these shows went on sale on 6 February 2014, with Kylie Minogue’s Newmarket concert selling out 30 minutes after tickets were released.

Between 19 June and 29 August 2015, the company staged 16 events across 6 racecourses, including performances from:

- Kylie Minogue
- Status Quo (band)
- Kaiser Chiefs
- Spandau Ballet
- Madness (band)
- Boyzone
- Sir Tom Jones
- McBusted

In September 2015 The Jockey Club Live announced a new partnership with promoter Live Nation UK.

Under the new agreement Live Nation UK provides live music promotion expertise to Jockey Club Live and assumes responsibility for booking artists to appear at the company’s shows.

== 2016 ==
Between 13 May and 27 August 2016, the company staged 19 events across 7 racecourses, including performances from:

- Deacon Blue
- Sir Tom Jones
- The Corrs
- Will Young
- Jess Glynne
- Kaiser Chiefs
- Busted (band)
- Tears for Fears
- Bryan Adams
- Mark Ronson
- Lisa Stansfield
- Little Mix

Since 2017, The Jockey Club Live has operated as an independent promoter.

== 2017 ==
Between 19 May and 26 August 2017, the company staged 21 events across 8 racecourses, including performances from:

- Kaiser Chiefs
- Olly Murs
- Clean Bandit with Louisa Johnson
- Jess Glynne
- Little Mix
- The Jacksons
- Sir Tom Jones
- Culture Club
- Texas (band)
- James (band)
- Chase & Status

== 2018 ==
Between 18 May and 25 August 2018, the company staged 19 events across 6 racecourses, including performances from:

- The Lightning Seeds
- Plan B (musician)
- Demi Lovato
- Craig David
- Paloma Faith
- James Blunt
- George Ezra
- The Magic of Motown
- Nile Rodgers & Chic (band)
- The Vamps (British band)

== 2019 ==
Between 17 May and 17 August 2019, the company staged 19 events across 6 racecourses, including performances from:

- Madness (band)
- Jess Glynne
- Nile Rodgers & Chic (band)
- UB40
- Kaiser Chiefs
- Sigala
- Thriller Live
- Rudimental
- Pete Tong & The Heritage Orchestra
- Bananarama
- Years & Years
- Craig David

== 2021 ==
Between 23 July and 28 August 2021, the company staged 3 events across 6 racecourses, including performances from:

- Tom Jones
- Olly Murs
- Craig David
- Jess Glynne
- Rick Astley
- McFly

== 2022 ==
Between 10 June and 12 August 2022, the company staged 14 events across 4 racecourses, including performances from:

- Nile Rodgers & Chic (band)
- Paloma Faith
- Rudimental
- The Script
- Madness (band)
- Queen Symphonic
- Anne-Marie
- Simply Red
- The Wombats
- Pete Tong & The Heritage Orchestra

== 2023 ==
Between 19 May and 18 August 2023, the company staged 12 events across 6 racecourses, including performances from:

- Sugababes
- Pete Tong & The Essential Orchestra
- Craig David
- Bastille (band)
- Faithless DJ Set
- Tom Jones (singer)
- Hacienda Classical
- McFly
- Nile Rodgers & CHIC (band)
- Olly Murs
- Tom Grennan

== 2024 ==
Between 21 June and 16 August 2024, the company staged 13 events across 4 racecourses, including performances from:

- Pete Tong's Ibiza Classics
- JLS
- Busted (band)
- Madness (band)
- Tom Jones (singer)
- James Arthur with support from Ella Henderson
- McFly
- Becky Hill
- Earth, Wind & Fire Experience by Al McKay
- Deacon Blue
