= MoAZ =

Belarusian manufacturing company

MoAZ, Mogilev Automobile Plant MoA3, Могилевский автомобильный завод
- Type: JSC
- Industry: Automotive
- Founded: 1948
- Headquarters: Mogilev, Belarus
- Area served: Worldwide, CIS
- Products: Dump trucks Heavy equipment Goods wagons
- Parent: BelAZ
- Website: MoAZ official page

Mogilevskiy Avtomobilny Zavod imeni S. M. Kirova, abbreviated MoAZ, (Belarusian: Магілёўскі аўтамабільны завод (МаАЗ)/Russian: Могилевский автомобильный завод имени С. М. Кирова (MoA3)), is an automotive and earth-moving equipment manufacturer located in the city of Mogilev, Belarus. MoAZ has been a subsidiary of BelAZ since 2006. In 1958 MoAZ was named in honor of Sergey Kirov, an early Bolshevik leader in the Soviet Union.

== History ==
The company was founded in 1935 as Workshop. In 1941 the plant was evacuated to Kuibyshev, where engines for the attack aircraft IL-2 were produced.

After World War II the plant was returned to Mogilev and produced locomotives, steam-powered machinery, overhead cranes, and tank lorries based on GAZ-51 lorries. In 1958 the factory started the production of the single-axle MAZ-529, developed by the Minsk Automobile Plant (MAZ).

In 2006 the factory became a branch of JSC "BelAZ", which has been a branch of "BelAZ-Holding" since 2012. Most MoAZ vehicles are exported; more than 85% of the produced vehicles are sold in CIS member states.

== Current products ==
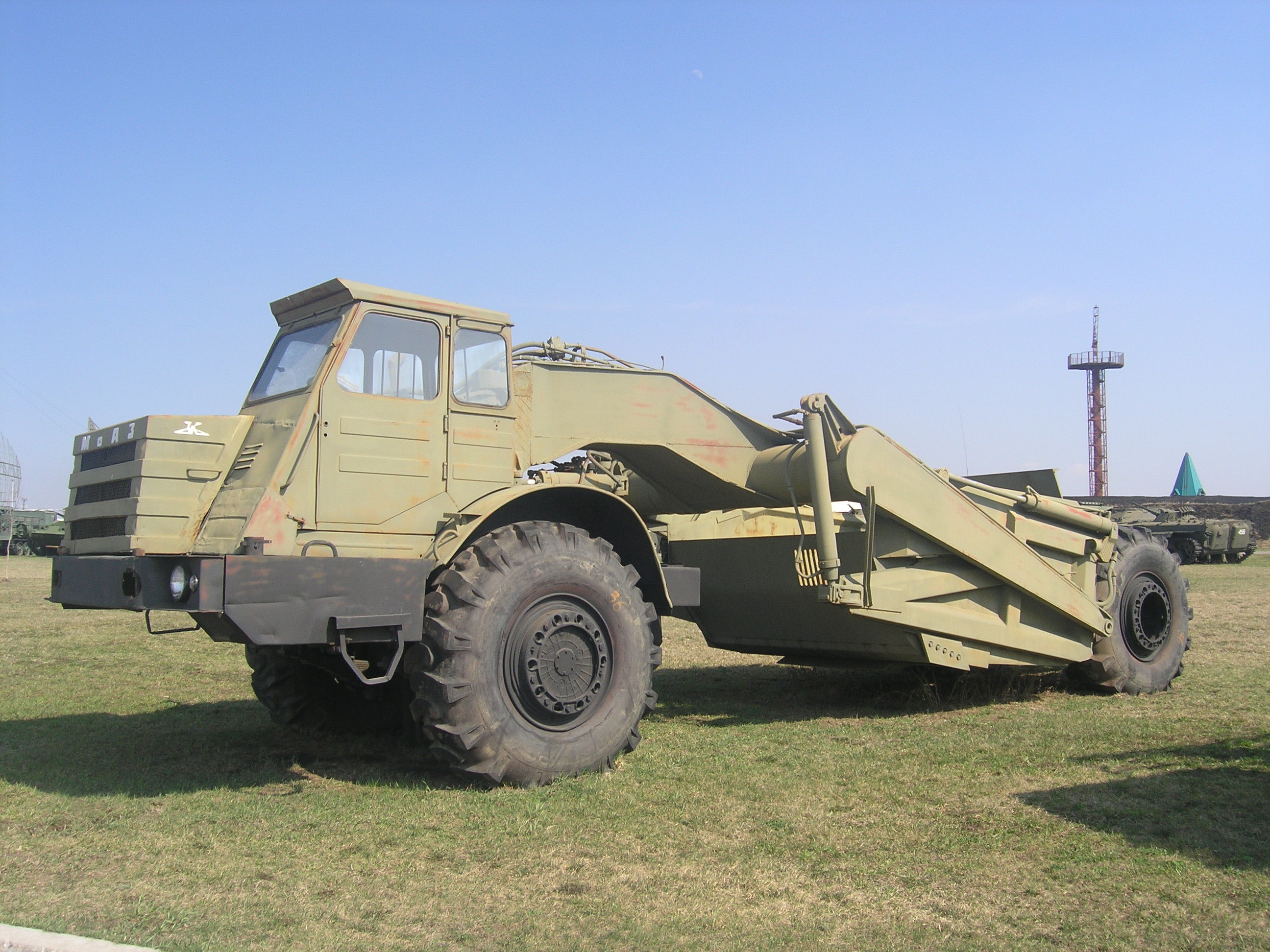
MOAZ-6014 Scraper in Togliatti Technical museum.

- Self-propelled scrapers (MoAZ-6014);
- Loaders (MoAZ-40484);
- Dump trucks (MoAZ-7505, MoAZ-7529);
- Underground trains (MoAZ-7405-9586);
- Lorries (MoAZ-049, MoAZ-060, MoAZ-070);
- Motorized rollers (MoAZ-6442-9890);
- Wheeled bulldozers (MoAZ-40486, MoAZ-40489);
- Electric cars (EC-1.00);
- Tractors (MoAZ-49011);
- Airdrome trucks (MoAZ-7915);
- Engineering tractors for the Belarus Army.
