= Jockeying (association football) =

Defender's skill in association football

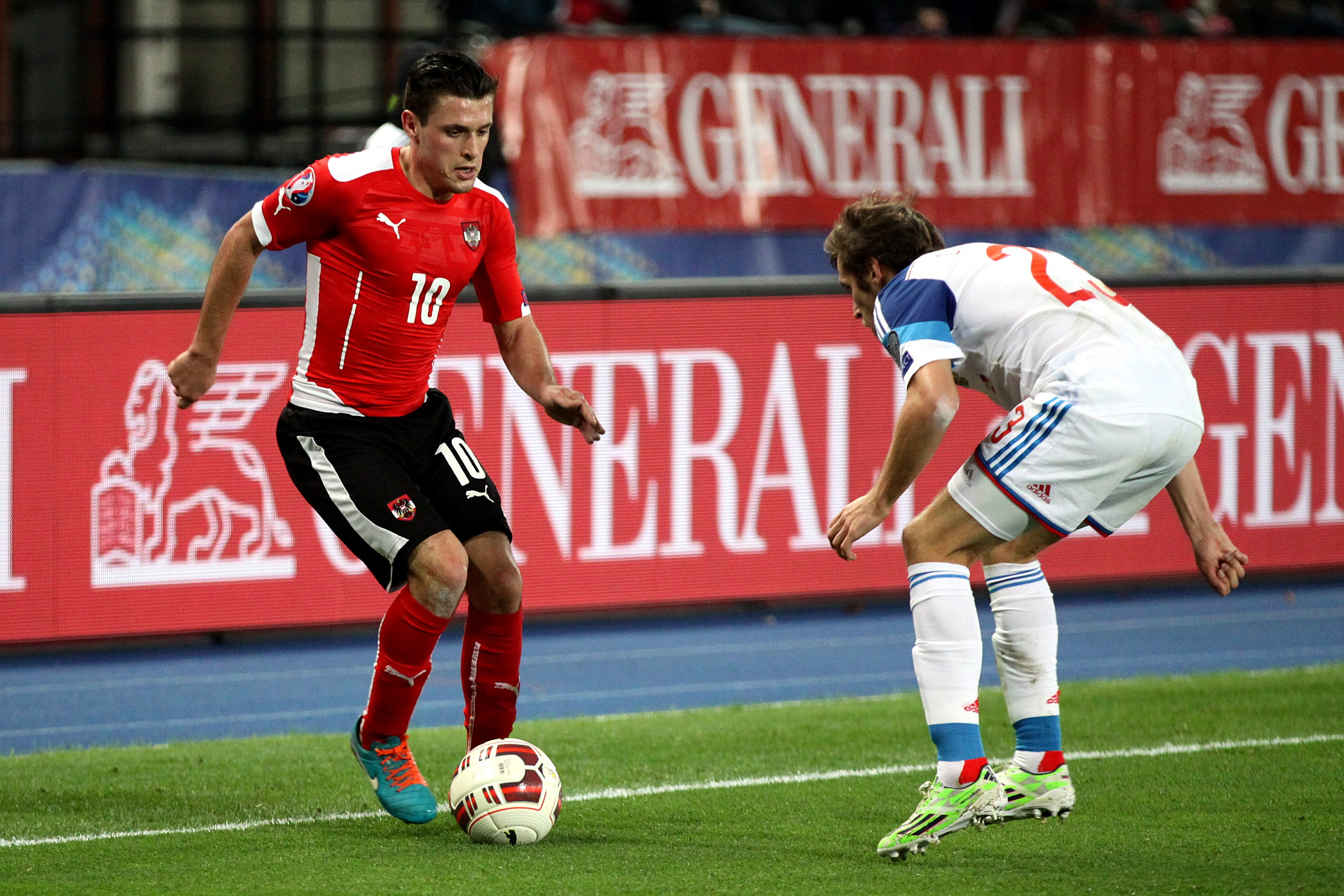
Jockeying position (right)

In association football, jockeying (also called "shepherding" or "guiding") is the defender's skill of keeping between the attacker and their intended target (usually the goal). It requires the defender to slow down or delay the attacker by backing off slowly while simultaneously trying to force an error or make a successful tackle.

The defender should be in a low position with both knees bent, turned slightly at an angle from the attacker.
