= Jockey Club (Atlantic City, New Jersey) =

Former jazz venue in New Jersey, US

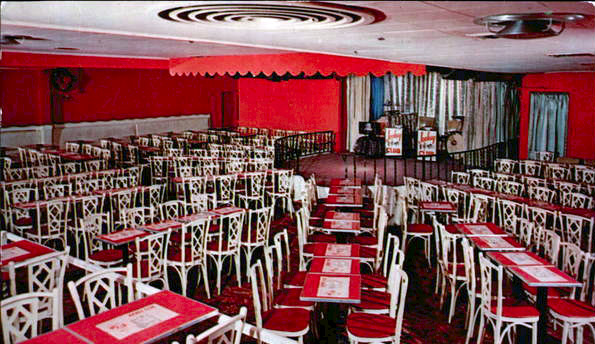
Jockey Club interior

The Jockey Club was a jazz club at 7 South North Carolina Avenue in Atlantic City, New Jersey, United States.

It was one of the oldest jazz venues in the city, operating since the 1920s. According to author Michael Pollock it was "home to mellow jazz musicians and tired prostitutes". Guitarist Pat Martino notes that Jimmy Smith and Kenny Burrell would frequently play at the club. It was at the Jockey Club that he had first seen Jimmy Smith with Charles Earland.

The Jockey Club was destroyed by a fire in September 1982. The club had previously been closed for years and was reopened in May 1982.
