= Jock =

Jock may refer to:

== Common meanings ==
- Jock (stereotype), a North American term for a stereotypical male athlete
- Jock, a derogatory term for Scottish people mostly used by the English
- Short for jockstrap, an item of male protective undergarment
- Jocks, male briefs in Australian slang

== Places ==
- Jock River, Canada
- Jocks Lagoon, Tasmania

== People ==
- Jock (given name), a list of people with the first name or nickname
- Charles Jock (born 1989), American middle-distance runner
- Duach Jock (born 1986), South Sudanese soccer player
- Jock (cartoonist) (born 1972), British comic book artist Mark Simpson
- Jock McIver, a stage name, along with Talbot O'Farrell, of English music hall performer William Parrott (1878–1952)

== Fictional characters ==
- Jock, pilot in game Deus Ex
- Jock, a Scottish Terrier in Lady and the Tramp and Lady and the Tramp II: Scamp's Adventure
- Wee Jock, a Highland Terrier in Hamish Macbeth
- Jock Ewing, in Dallas on television
- Jock Lindsey, a pilot from Raiders of the Lost Ark

== Other uses ==
- Jocks (film), a 1987 film
- Jock the Hero Dog, an animated film from 2011
- The Jocks, the British Army 9th (Scottish) Division
- Jock, a dog, subject of the book Jock of the Bushveld by Sir Percy Fitzpatrick

== See also ==
- The Jocks and the Geordies, a comic strip
