= Jockey wheel =

A jockey wheel is a wheel-based mechanical system used for steering or guidance, either:

- a guide wheel — usually operating as a pair — which is used to move, retain, locate and (usually) add tension to a chain, rope or cable which is then fed into the groove of another wheel, toothed wheel, cog or sprocket;
- a (frequently) retractable, smaller, height-adjustable wheel located on the front of a trailer or caravan for the low-speed manoeuvring or manual steering of said trailer-based unit when decoupled from the powered vehicle to which it was attached.

== On trailers ==
A jockey wheel for vehicular use is a retractable adjustable-height wheel used on the front of trailers (or caravans) with either a single axle (two running wheels) or more close-coupled axles at or near the centre of gravity whereby without additional support, the trailer would not remain level. The jockey wheel is close to the towing hitch and has a built-in screw jack to enable the trailer nose to be lifted over the tow ball of a car or other powered vehicle. The screw jack can then be used to lower the trailer nose onto the tow ball. Once securely attached to the towing vehicle, the jockey wheel's jacking action is fully retracted for stowage. The jockey wheel can also be unclamped and lifted as far as possible to give the greatest ground clearance before reclamping prior to a journey being made.

Jockey wheels incorporate a caster action, permitting travel in any direction while handling a trailer while it is not attached to a vehicle.

== On bicycle derailleurs ==
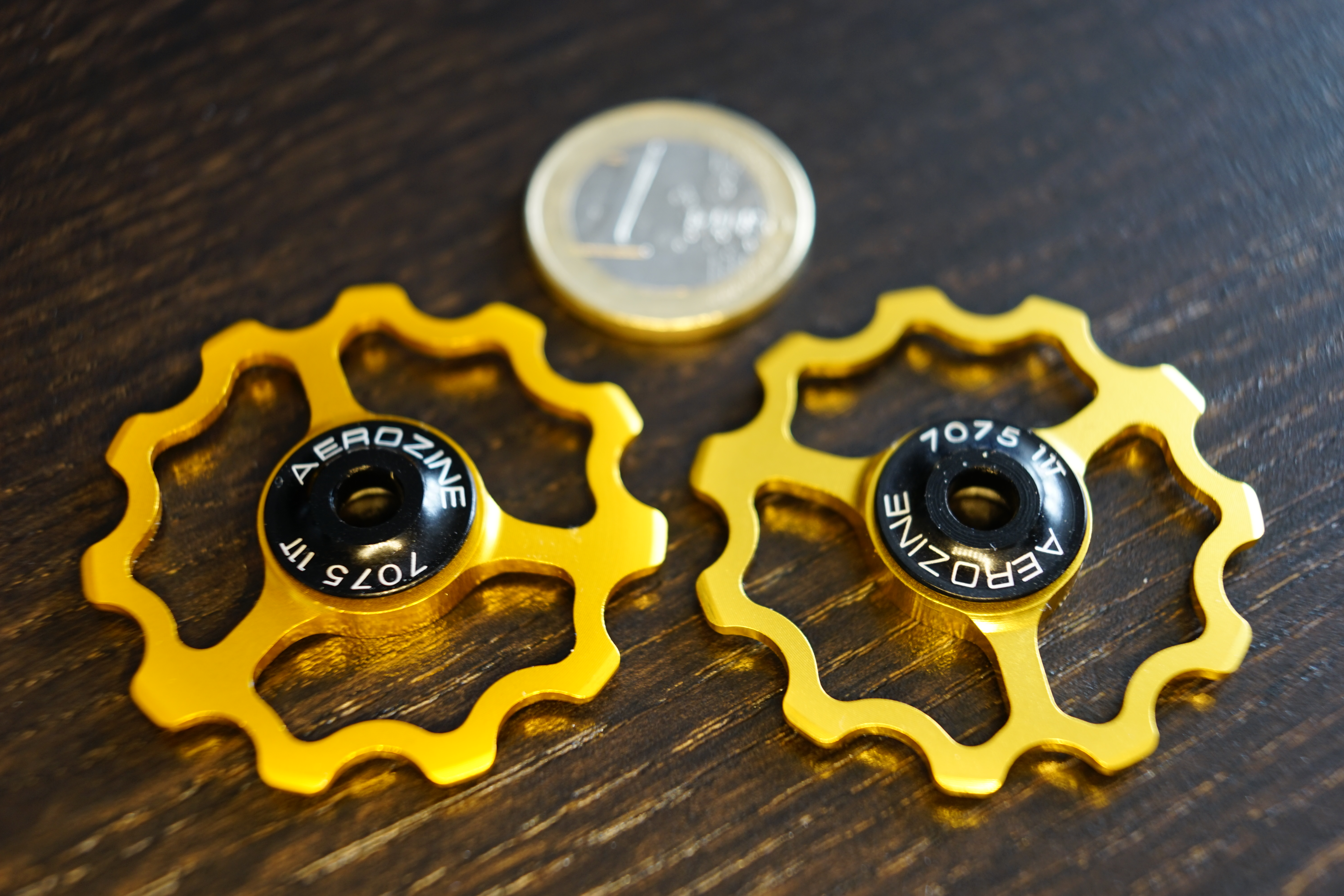
Bicycle rear derailleur jockey wheels

Although variations exist, a derailleur move the chain from one sprocket to another on a bicycle's cassette and the jockey wheels take up slack in the chain as it is fed from one of the front chainrings. The jockey wheels are held in a cage. This cage holds two guide pulleys that locate the chain, almost always in a vertically positioned S-shaped pattern (an S in reverse when viewed from the bike's drive side). The pulleys are known collectively as the jockey wheels or jockey pulleys - the guide pulley is at the top of the pairing (closest to the sprockets) and the tension pulley is at the bottom.

== See also ==
- Bicycle drivetrain systems
