= Air dam =

Air dam may refer to various aerodynamic devices:

- Spoiler (car), on automobiles
- Spoiler (aeronautics), on aircraft
- Trailer skirt, on semi-trailers
