= Teardrop trailer (truck) =

A teardrop trailer is an aerodynamically shaped semi-trailer with a curved-roof that differs in shape from the traditional rectangularly shaped trailer. The trailer is meant to be paired with a compatibly designed tractor unit leading to greater fuel efficiency of the tractor-trailer combination. As such, the "teardrop" phrase refers to the entire combination, not just the trailer. The curved shape of the roof decreases aerodynamic drag by smoothing airflow over the top, thus improving fuel efficiency.

One operator has reported the trailers save 2% in fuel in service that included significant low speed delivery operation and 5% in higher speed long-haul operation.

Another factor improving airflow is the gap between the tractor and trailer is minimized to lessen the amount of turbulence created by air flowing into the gap.

The design echos streamlined shapes used in submarines, automobiles and camping trailers. The first streamlined car was the Tropfenwagen introduced in 1921, named after its teardrop shape (the literal translation from German is "drop car").

A study of trucking fleets in North American found that improving trailer aerodynamics was the least used method for improving fuel efficiency. Improving tractor aerodynamics and using low rolling resistance tires were adopted at much higher rates.

== Adoption ==
The trailers have been used in the United Kingdom for several years by various operators. Deutsche Post DHL operates over 1,100 in the UK and was the first operator in continental Europe; it announced in 2014 that it would use the trailers in France and Germany.

== See also ==
- Semi-trailer aerodynamic device, a device affixed to a semi-trailer to reduce drag and fuel costs, commonly used in North America
