= Self unloading trailer =

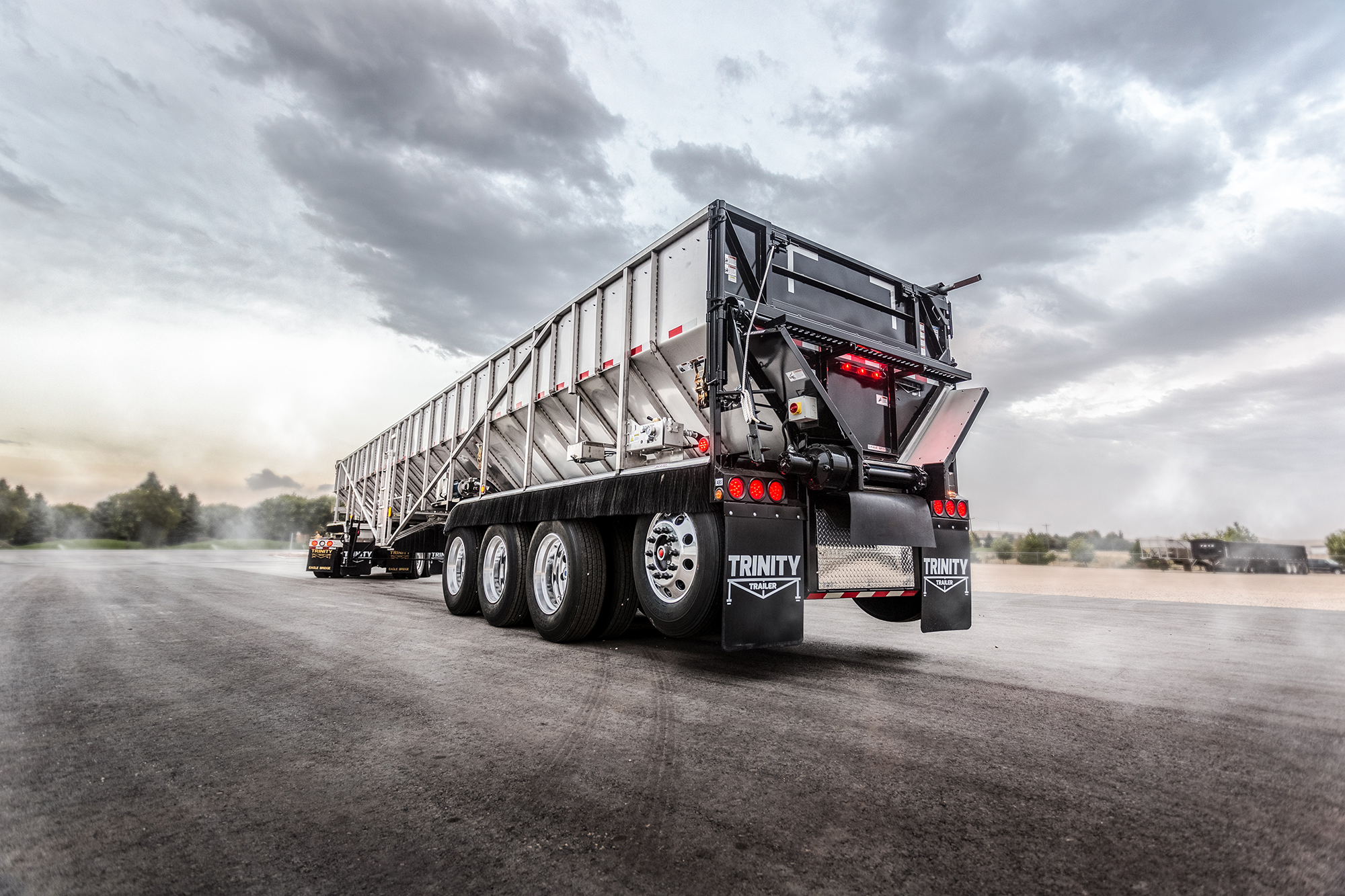
Originally designed by Trinity Trailer Mfg., Inc.® in 1974, the EagleBridge is a self-unloading belt trailer.

A belt trailer or self unloading belt trailer is a semi-trailer that uses either a chain and flap assembly or a continuous belt that runs lengthwise on the bottom of the trailer. The belt is bolted to bars that in turn bolt to a chain that runs the length of the trailer. This belt is usually composed of rubber that allows the belt to grip the product and various widths are available depending on manufacturer generally ranging from 25 inches to 61 inches wide. A planetary, which is powered by a PTO pump, electric, or gas motor, cycles the belt.

Products hauled in these trailers include but are not limited to bulk commodities, agricultural commodities, municipal waste, and construction debris. The asphalt paving industry also uses this type of trailer or truck chassis mounted unit to haul hot mix asphalt from the batch plant to the job site. Aggregates used in road building are often hauled with these units. Belt trailers generally utilize a sloped side that in most cases is covered in plastic which allows the product to slide down the sidewall onto the belt. The unload times for belt trailers usually is less than five minutes and the driver does not need to climb into the trailer to sweep like a moving floor trailer or more commonly referred to as walking floor. Generally most belt trailers are made out of aluminum, but some manufacturers feature steel and stainless steel construction that can be used in off road conditions and for hauling corrosive materials.

In 1974, the first belt trailer was made and patented by Trinity Trailer. Today, the company produces the EagleBridge—a frameless all steel trailer—as well as the AGRI-FLEX, a belt trailer primarily focused on agricultural products such as chopped hay or silage. Other belt trailer manufacturers include Aulick, Hi-Way, Wilson, and Western.
