= Globe Trailers =

Automative Company

- Type: Private
- Industry: Heavy equipment
- Founded: 1982
- Headquarters: Bradenton, Florida, USA
- Key people: Jeff Walters, President
- Products: Manufacturer/sale of new trailers, parts, service and training
- Revenue: Not disclosed
- Number of employees: 30 (2004) 85 (2010) 115 (2020)
- Website: globetrailers.com

Globe Trailers is a privately held corporation headquartered in Bradenton, Florida, midway between Tampa and Naples. It is a semi-trailer manufacturer.

== History ==
This heavy equipment-manufacturing company was founded in 1982 and was bought by the Walters family in 2004. When purchased, Globe Trailers was manufacturing 30 trailers per year. In 2010, Globe Trailers produced over 400 trailers. Today, Globe Trailers designs and manufactures Lowboys, Dump, Sliding Axle, Tag, Flatbeds, Single Drops, Custom, and Military trailers in the United States.

== Gallery ==
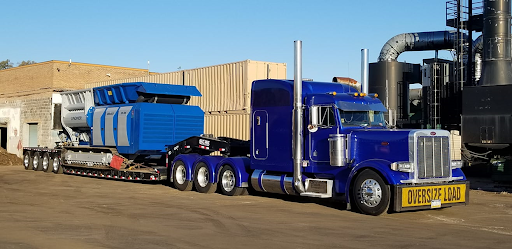

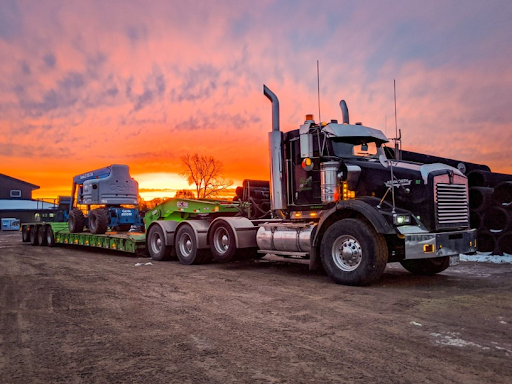

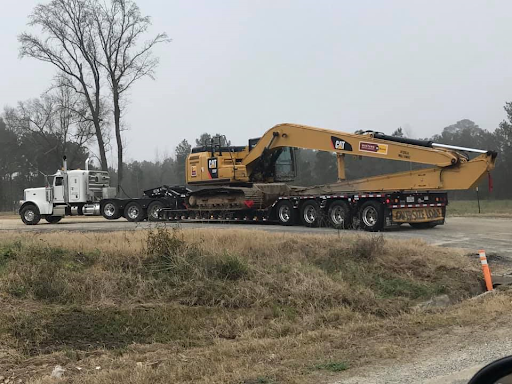

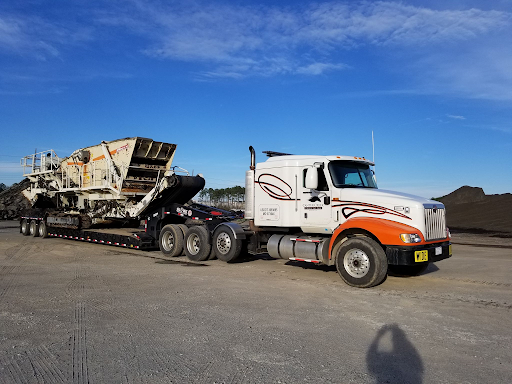

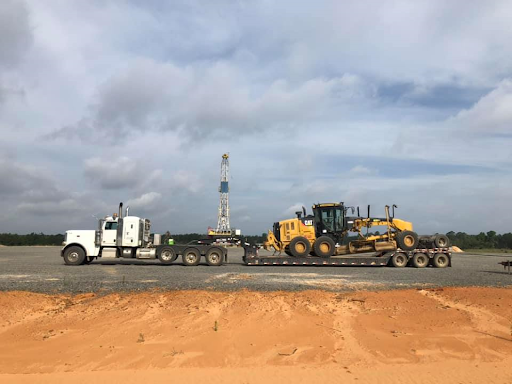
