= Semi-trailer aerodynamic device =

Fuel economy improvement device

Semi-trailer aerodynamic devices are devices affixed to semi-trailers, for the purpose of reducing aerodynamic drag caused by air turbulence. The two major types of device in use are trailer skirts (or side skirts), affixed to the underside of trailers, and trailer tails (or boat tails, or rear fairings), affixed to the rear. Several such devices have been recognized by the U.S. Environmental Protection Agency's SmartWay Transport Partnership, making them eligible for funding under the Diesel Emissions Reduction Act.

== Trailer skirts ==
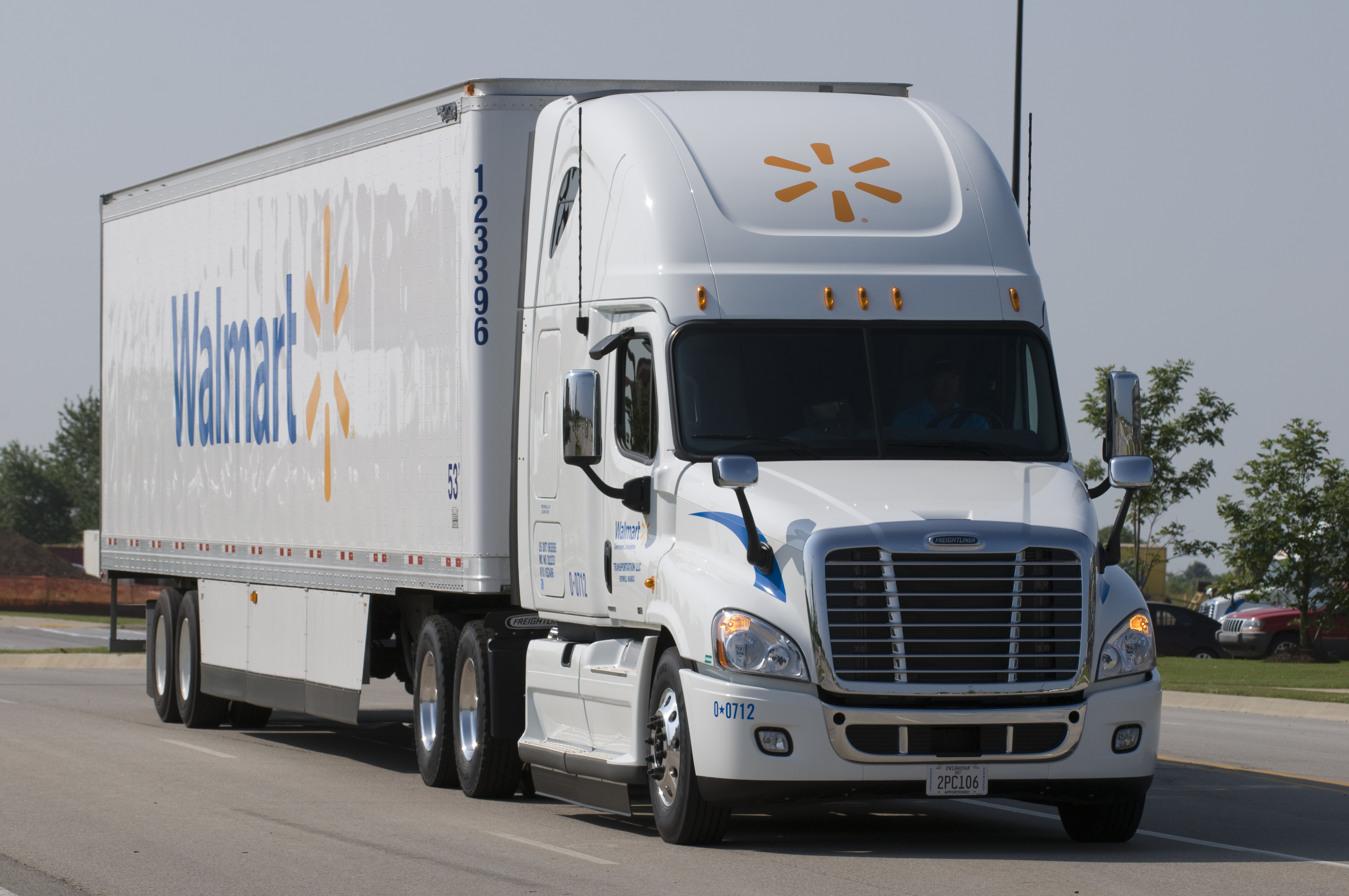
Detail of trailer skirt

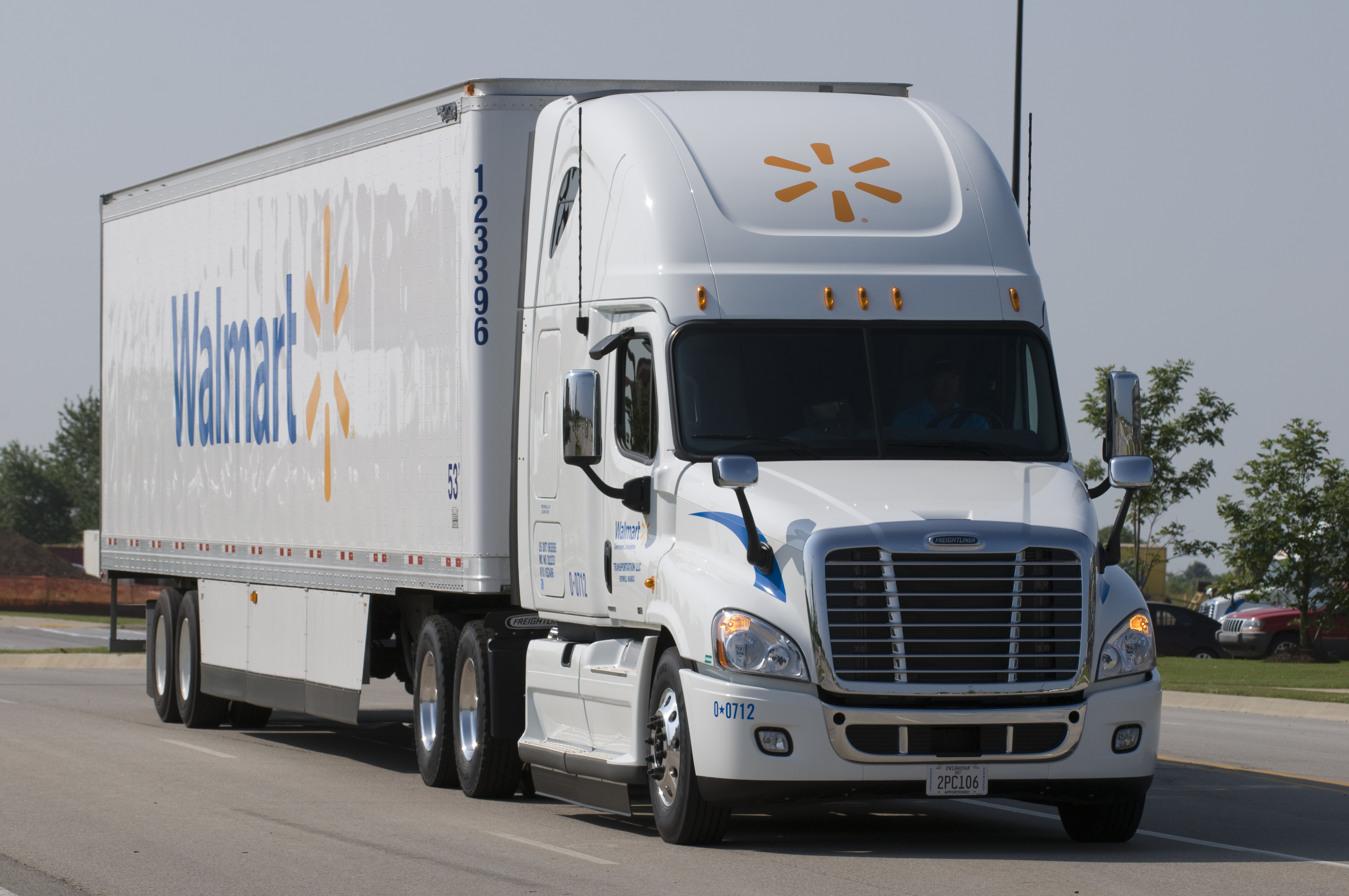
A semi-trailer truck with trailer skirts installed

=== Construction ===
Trailer skirts comprise a pair of panels affixed to the lower side edges of a trailer, running most of the length of the trailer and filling the gap between the forward and rear axles. Trailer skirts are typically constructed of aluminum, plastic, or fiberglass, with plastic the most resistant to damage from side or bottom impacts. Skirts may have a modular design, allowing installation on a variety of trailer lengths. Skirts generally weigh between 70 and 160 kg (150 and 350 lb). Installation typically requires three to five person-hours.

=== Cost ===
As of 2009, a set of trailer skirts cost between C$1500 and C$3000 (US$1300 to $2700). Standard trailer skirts have an estimated payback period of ten to eighteen months, while "advanced" skirts (those that improve fuel efficiency by over 7%) are estimated to pay for themselves in seven to fourteen months.

=== Performance ===
A 2012 investigation by SAE International of nine trailer skirt designs found that three provided fuel savings greater than 5%, and four provided savings between 4% and 5%, compared with an unmodified trailer. Skirts with reduced ground clearance offer greater fuel savings; in one instance, reducing ground clearance from 16 in (41 cm) to 8 in (20 cm) resulted in an improvement in fuel savings from 4% to 7%. One 2008 Delft University of Technology study found fuel savings of up to 15% for the particular design studied. Sean Graham, president of a major supplier of trailer skirts, estimates that in typical use, drivers see fuel savings of 5% to 6%.

Trailers with skirts fitted have also demonstrated reduced tire spray, and drivers have reported improved stability in crosswinds.

=== Adoption ===
As of 2018, over 60% of new trailers produced in Australia are equipped with skirts, whereas the figure is over 50% for the North American market.

A 2014 study by the North American Council for Freight Efficiency on adoption of fuel efficient technologies and practices found trailer skirts to be the most widely adopted technology of those studied, having been adopted by seven of the ten major shipping fleets in the study.

Since the wide adoption of trailer skirts, incidents of them becoming detached and colliding with other vehicles have increased. On October 18, 2018, a trailer skirt came off of a tractor trailer traveling East in Knoxville, Tennessee and hit a westbound car, killing its driver.

== Trailer tails ==
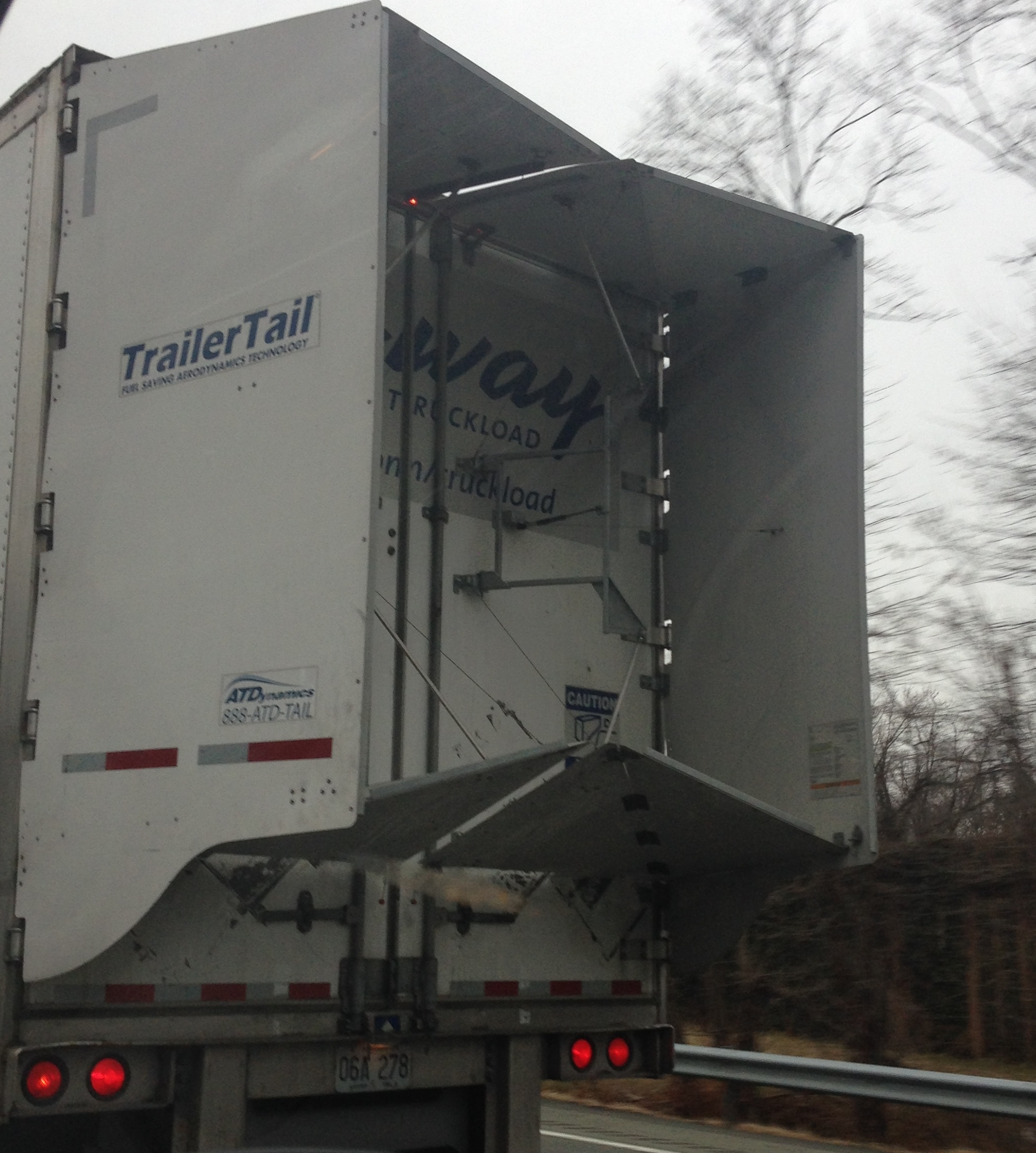
Trailer tail at the rear of a semi-trailer in 2013

Trailer tails, boat tails, or rear fairings comprise a set of panels, usually collapsible, which fold out from the rear of the trailer, creating a tapered shape that reduces drag from the low-pressure wake created behind the trailer. Trailer tails alone have demonstrated a fuel savings of 1%–5%, and in concert with trailer skirts, 9% improvement has been demonstrated.

TrailerTail is a registered trademark of STEMCO.

=== SuperTruck project ===
At least one model of trailer tail, trade named TrailerTail, is part of Navistar's SuperTruck project, which will use $37 million of US Department of Energy grants to build next generation trucks and tractor trailers.

== See also ==
- Teardrop trailer (truck), an aerodynamically shaped trailer in use in the UK
